= Amateur radio operator =

Operator of radio waves

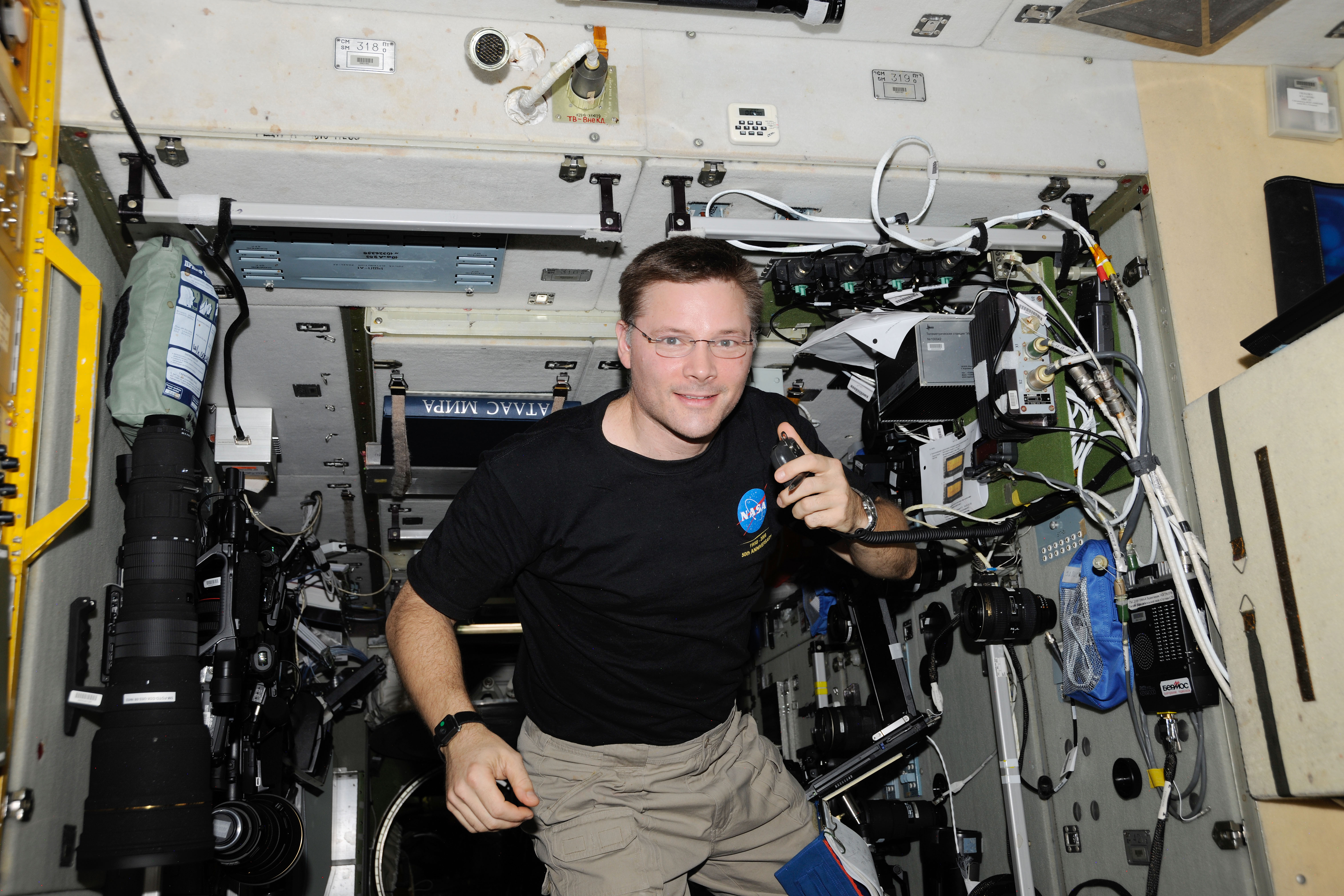
NASA astronaut Col. Doug Wheelock, KF5BOC, Expedition 24 flight engineer, operates the NA1SS ham radio station in the Zvezda Service Module of the International Space Station. Equipment is a Kenwood TM-D700E transceiver.

An amateur radio operator is someone who uses equipment at an amateur radio station to engage in two-way personal communications with other amateur operators on radio frequencies assigned to the amateur radio service. Amateur radio operators have been granted an amateur radio license by a governmental regulatory authority after passing an examination on applicable regulations, electronics, radio theory, and radio operation. As a component of their license, amateur radio operators are assigned a call sign that they use to identify themselves during communication. About three million amateur radio operators are currently active worldwide.

Amateur radio operators are also known as radio amateurs or hams. The term "ham" as a nickname for amateur radio operators originated in a pejorative usage (like "ham actor") by operators in commercial and professional radio communities, and dates to wired telegraphy. The word was, in the 1920s, adopted by amateur radio operators.

== Demographics ==
Country	Number of amateur radio operators	% population	Year of Report	Source
United States	748,519	0.223	2024	
Japan	381,899	0.304	2021	
Thailand	101,763	0.147	2018	
China	240,000	0.017	2024	
Germany	63,070	0.073	2019	
Canada	70,198	0.187	2018	
Spain	58,700	0.127	1999	
United Kingdom	75,660	0.114	2018	
South Korea	42,632	0.082	2012	
Russia	38,000	0.026	1993	
Brazil	32,053	0.016	1997	
Turkey	32,000	0.037	2023	
Italy	30,000	0.049	1993	
Indonesia	27,815	0.011	1997	
France	13,500	0.019	2022	
Ukraine	17,265	0.037	2000	
Argentina	16,889	0.042	1999	
Poland	15,805	0.041	2024	
Australia	15,448	0.060	2023	
India	15,679	0.001	2000	
Sweden	12,790	0.113	2023	
Netherlands	12,582	0.07	2018	
Malaysia	11,273	0.03	2023	
Denmark	9,079	0.152	2022	
Slovenia	6,500	0.317	2000	
Austria	6,930	0.077	2022	
New Zealand	6,000	0.12	1994	
South Africa	6,000	0.012	1994	
Norway	6,818	0.125	2022	
Czech Republic	5,332	0.05	2023	
Finland	5,000	0.090	2016	
Serbia	3,962	0.056	2020	
Romania	3,527	0.018	2017	
Hungary	3,234	0.033	2023	
Ireland	1,945	0.039	2020	
Slovakia	1,745	0.032	2023	

Few governments maintain detailed demographic statistics of their amateur radio operator populations, aside from recording the total number of licensed operators. The majority of amateur radio operators worldwide reside in the United States, Japan, and the nations of East Asia, North America, and Europe. The top five countries by percentage of the population are Slovenia, Japan, the United States, Canada, and Denmark. Only the governments of Yemen and North Korea currently prohibit their citizens from becoming amateur radio operators. Although not officially outlawed, it is effectively impossible to become licensed in Eritrea as well, and there are no licensed operators in Eritrea. There are also very few if any operators in Turkmenistan and Myanmar. In other countries, acquiring an amateur radio license is difficult because of the bureaucratic processes or fees that place access to a license out of reach for most citizens. Most nations permit foreign nationals to earn an amateur radio license, but very few amateur radio operators are licensed in multiple countries.

=== Gender ===
In the vast majority of countries, the population of amateur radio operators is predominantly male. In China, 12% of amateur radio operators are women, while approximately 15% of amateur radio operators in the United States are women. The Young Ladies Radio League is an international organization of female amateur radio operators.

A male amateur radio operator can be referred to as an OM, an abbreviation used in Morse code telegraphy for "old man", regardless of the operator's age. A single female amateur radio operator can be referred to as a YL, from the abbreviation used for "young lady", regardless of the operator's age. A licensed married female is sometimes referred to as an XYL. The term "XYL" also often means the wife of a licensed amateur operator, whether or not she is herself licensed.

=== Age ===
Most countries do not have a minimum age requirement in order to earn an amateur radio license and become an amateur radio operator. Although the number of amateur radio operators in many countries increases from year to year, the average age of amateur radio operators is relatively high. The average age of an American Radio Relay League member is 68 years old as of 2019.

The unfavourable age distribution has led to a slow decrease in amateur operator numbers in most industrialised countries due to attrition, but in countries which do not apply yearly licence fees, the effects are not immediately noticed. It has been estimated from German statistics, which are considered the most reliable, that the net decrease currently is in the order of 1 to 1.5% per year. The average age of most amateur radio operators is approaching 70 in most European countries.

Some national radio societies have responded to the aging ham population by developing programs specifically to encourage youth participation in amateur radio, such as the American Radio Relay League's Amateur Radio Education and Technology Program. The World Wide Young Contesters organization promotes youth involvement, particularly among Europeans, in competitive radio contesting. A strong tie also exists between the amateur radio community and the Scouting movement to introduce radio technology to youth. World Organization of the Scout Movement's annual Jamboree on the Air is Scouting's largest activity, with a half million Scouts and Guides speaking with each other using amateur radio each October.

=== US amateurs by state ===
State	Total	%	Rank	Club
AA	4	0.00	59	0
AE	157	0.02	56	0
AK	3847	0.46	45	80
AL	13228	1.59	22	244
AP	144	0.02	57	1
AR	8914	1.07	31	129
AS	25	0.00	58	3
AZ	22166	2.78	12	249
CA	115787	13.93	1	1528
CO	20369	2.45	16	222
CT	8178	0.98	32	188
DC	587	0.07	52	54
DE	1930	0.23	50	38
FL	46856	5.64	3	610
GA	20650	2.48	14	390
GU	334	0.04	54	13
HI	4386	0.53	43	117
IA	6993	0.84	35	119
ID	10404	1.25	28	85
IL	21467	2.58	13	367
IN	16798	2.02	18	303
KS	7953	0.96	33	143
KY	10376	1.25	29	147
LA	6823	0.82	37	166
MA	14641	1.76	21	272
MD	12139	1.46	25	184
ME	4980	0.60	41	81
MI	22834	2.75	9	375
MN	12520	1.51	23	185
MO	16699	2.01	19	262
MP	353	0.04	53	18
MS	5849	0.70	39	131
MT	4450	0.54	42	63
NC	23549	2.83	8	337
ND	1729	0.21	51	53
NE	4083	0.49	44	81
NH	6035	0.73	38	112
NJ	14834	1.78	20	295
NM	7237	0.87	34	131
NV	8918	1.07	30	112
NY	29588	3.56	6	531
OH	30148	3.63	5	511
OK	10701	1.29	27	152
OR	22242	2.68	10	354
PA	26132	3.14	7	437
PR	5117	0.62	40	108
RI	2143	0.26	48	71
SC	10844	1.30	26	147
SD	2122	0.26	49	33
TN	20416	2.46	15	261
TX	58415	7.03	2	737
UT	19513	2.35	17	116
VA	22217	2.67	11	298
VI	298	0.04	55	27
VT	2307	0.28	46	59
WA	37494	4.51	4	515
WI	12178	1.47	24	215
WV	6854	0.82	36	78
WY	2281	0.27	47	37

NOTE:
AA..US Armed Forces Americas
AE..US Armed Forces Africa/Canada/Europe/Middle East
AP..US Armed Forces Pacific
AS..American Samoa
GU..Guam
MP..Mariana Islands
PR..Puerto Rico
VI..US Virgin Islands

=== Canadian amateurs by province ===
Province	Total	Rank
AB	7700	4
NL	1473	10
ON	23270	1
YT	214	12
BC	18827	3
NS	2647	5
PE	311	11
ZZ	1774	7
MB	2161	6
NT	95	13
QC	19039	2
NB	1688	8
NU	28	14
SK	1624	9

NOTE:
ZZ..Canadian amateurs outside of Canada

== Silent Key ==
When referring to a person, the phrase Silent Key, and its abbreviation SK, is a euphemism for an amateur radio operator who is deceased. The procedural signal "S̅K̅" (or "V̅A̅") has historically been used in Morse code as the last signal sent from a station before ending operation, usually just before shutting off the transmitter. Since this was the last signal received by other operators, the code was adopted to refer to any amateur radio operator who is deceased, regardless of whether they were known to have used telegraphy in their communications.

== Gallery ==
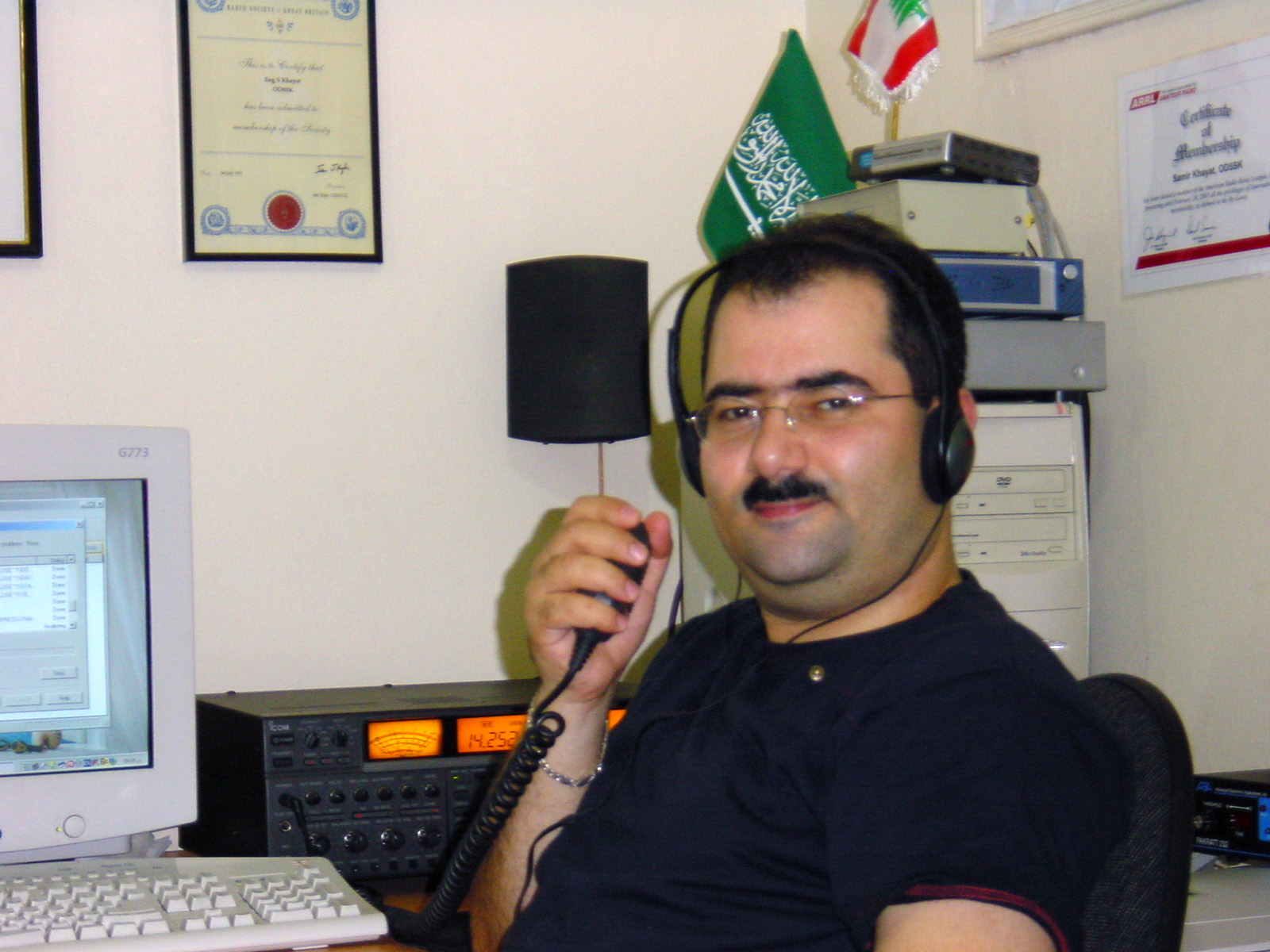
An operator working HF

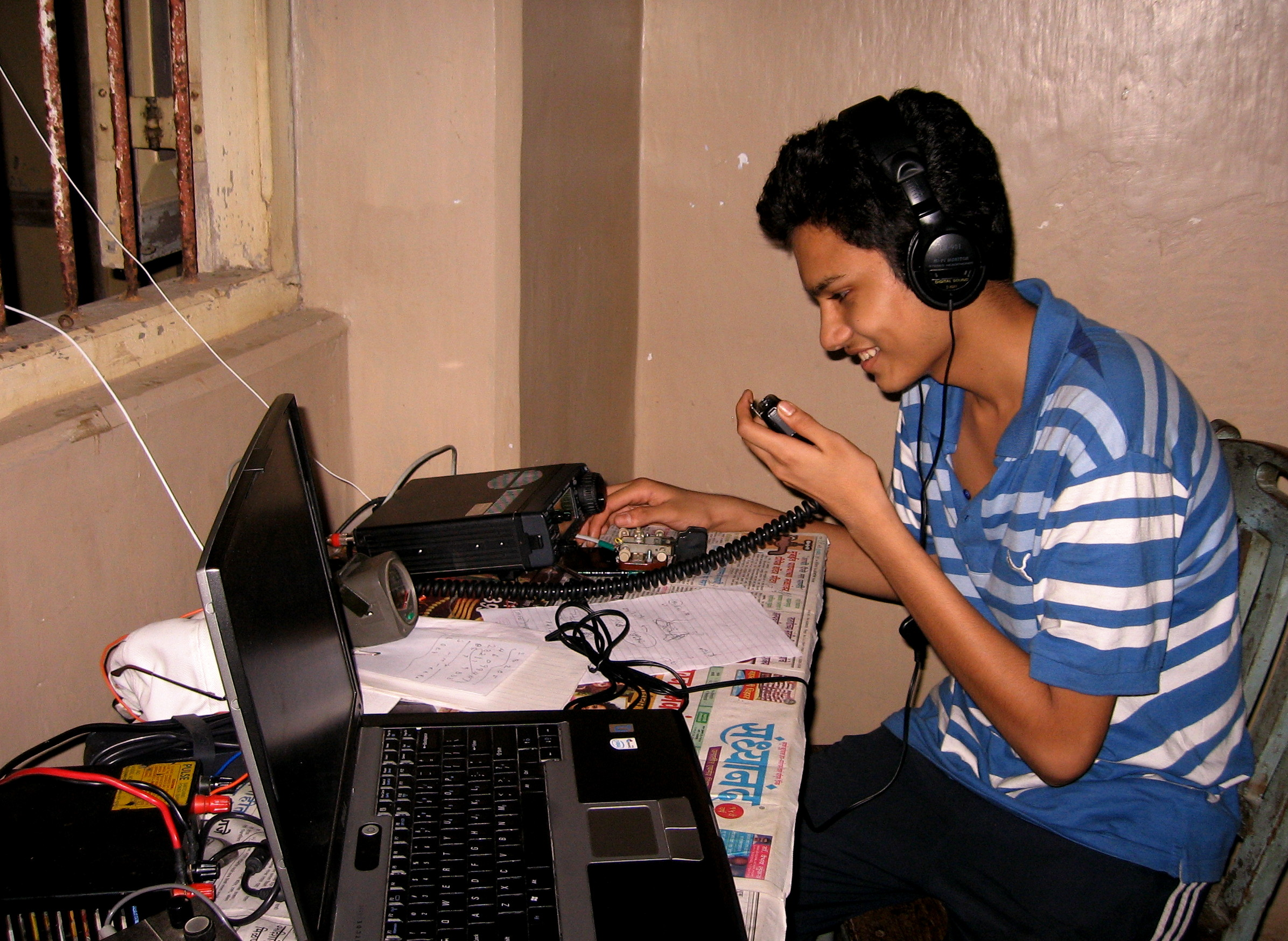
An operator working HF

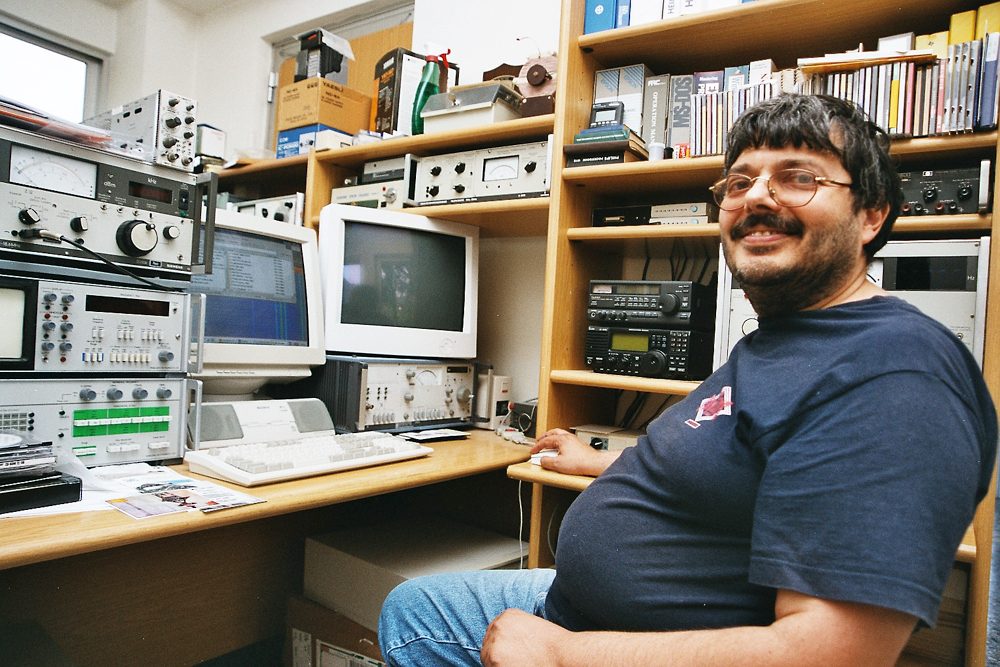
Amateur Radio station equipped for reception of VLF signals.

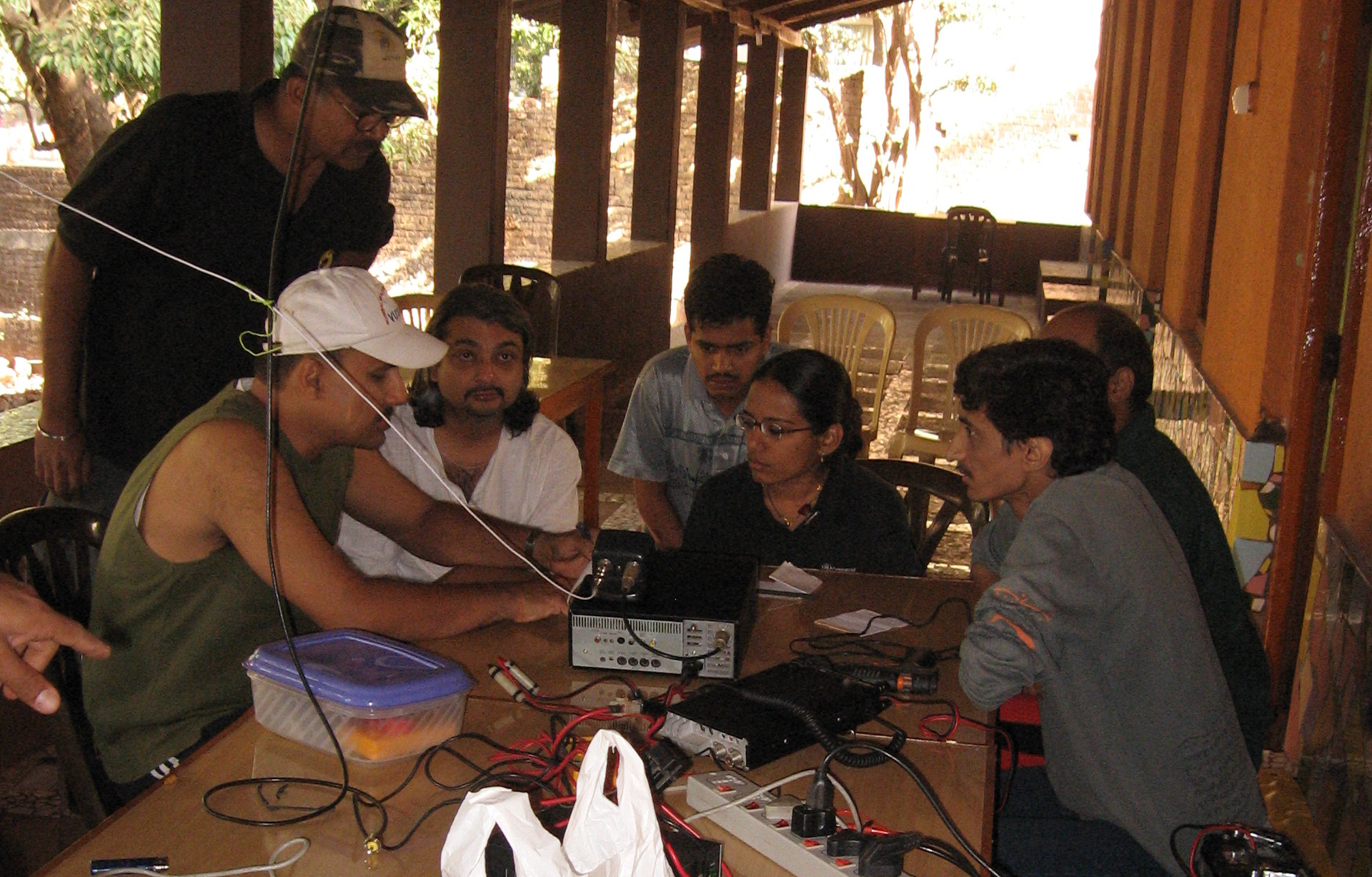
Amateur radio students

== Notable amateur radio operators ==
- Achille and Giovanni Battista
- Alan Moller
- Albert Gerald Sayre
- Albert II, Prince of Monaco
- Alfred J. Gross
- Allen Fairhall
- Alvin Devane
- Alvino Rey
- Andy Sannella
- Andy Thomas
- Anthony W. England
- Armas Valste
- Arnie Coro
- Art Bell
- Arthur A. Collins
- Arthur Godfrey
- Artie Moore
- Attilio Gatti
- Augie Hiebert
- Barbara Morgan
- Barry Goldwater
- Bdale Garbee
- Bhumibol Adulyadej
- Bob Heil
- Bob Tanna
- Bob Tomalski
- Brian Rix
- Brice Phillips
- Bruce Perens
- Carl Bødtker
- Carl Sassenrath
- Carver Mead
- Catherine Coleman
- Cathryn Mitchell
- Charles E. Apgar
- Charles E. Brady Jr.
- Charles Simonyi
- Charles Tart
- Chaaru Haasan
- Chet Atkins
- Chuck Forsberg
- Clarence C. Moore
- Clarence D. Tuska
- Clay T. Whitehead
- Clifford Stoll
- Clive Meredith
- Curtis LeMay
- Dalton Pritchard
- Daniel C. Burbank
- Dave Rowntree
- David Boggs
- David L. Mills
- David M. Brown
- David Packard (HP) W6YX
- Dean Spratt
- Diana Eng
- Dick Rutan
- Dick Smith
- Don Lancaster
- Donald Howard Menzel
- Douglas Mackiernan
- E. W. Bedford
- Ebbe Hoff
- Ed Iskenderian
- Edward K. Beale
- Edward S. Rogers Sr.
- Emily Calandrelli
- Eric Cole
- Ernest Lehman
- Ernst Krenkel
- Florence Violet McKenzie
- Francesco Cossiga
- Francis G. Rayer
- Fred Judd
- Friedhelm Hillebrand
- Garry Shandling
- George Fischbeck
- George Sassoon
- George Sweigert
- Gladys Kathleen Parkin
- Glen P. Robinson
- Gordon Eugene Martin
- Gordon Pettengill
- Gordon S. Marshall
- Greg Walden
- Grote Reber
- Guglielmo Marconi
- Haakon Sørbye
- Hank Magnuski KA6M
- Hans Peter Anvin
- Hans Schlegel
- Harold A. Zahl
- Harold Dorschug
- Harold E. Taylor
- Heidemarie Stefanyshyn-Piper
- Helen Sharman
- Henri G. Busignies
- Henry Bourne Joy
- Henry Feinberg
- Herbert Hoover Jr.
- Hiram Percy Maxim
- Hiroshi Amano
- Howard Gerrish
- Howard Hughes
- Howard J. Brewington
- Hugo Gernsback
- Hussein of Jordan
- Ian Orr-Ewing
- Jacob Beser
- Jack Kilby
- James Harvey Brown
- Jamie Dupree
- Jan Dahm
- Jason Morrison
- Jay Maynard
- Jean Shepherd
- Jeff Pulver
- Jenean Hampton
- Jeri Ellsworth
- Jerry Lawson
- Jimmy Treybig
- Joe Barr
- Joe Rudi
- Joe Walsh
- John Ambrose Fleming
- John Baldacci
- John H. DeWitt Jr.
- John Gilmore
- John Lees
- John Quade
- John Scott Redd
- Johnny Donovan
- Johnny Kwango
- Josaphat Chichkov
- Joseph Hooton Taylor Jr.
- Jure Šterk
- Karl Rothammel
- Kenneth D. Cameron
- Kevin Alfred Strom
- Kevin Mitnick
- Kurt Carlsen
- Larry Ferrari
- Laurel Clark
- Laurie Margolis
- Lawrie Brown
- Lelia Constantza Băjenescu
- Len Jarrett
- Leo Beranek
- Leo C. Young
- Leo Laporte
- Leonard Danilewicz
- Leslie R. Mitchell
- Lester Dent
- Lester Picker
- Linda M. Godwin
- Loyd Sigmon
- Ludomir Danilewicz
- Manuel J. Fernandez
- Marlon Brando
- Marshall D. Moran
- Martin Block
- Martin F. Jue
- Martin J. Fettman
- Matthew Sands
- Maximilian Kolbe
- Michael Bloomberg
- Naomi Uemura
- Nariman Printer
- Nevil Maskelyne
- Nigel Roberts
- Otakar Batlička
- Owen Garriott
- Palden Thondup Namgyal
- Paul Flaherty
- Paul Horowitz
- Paul Tibbets
- Percy Jones
- Pertti Kärkkäinen
- Phil Karn KA9Q
- Qaboos bin Said al Said
- Rajiv Gandhi
- Ray Szmanda
- Red Blanchard
- Richard Garriott
- Richard Lindzen
- Rik Jaeken
- Robert C. Michelson
- Roberto Vittori
- Rod Holt
- Ron Przybylinski
- Ronald Parise
- Ronnie Milsap
- Ross Gunn
- Rudy Van Gelder
- Rupert Goodwins
- Sandra Magnus
- Serena Auñón-Chancellor
- Sergei Avdeyev
- Sergei Krikalev
- Serhii Rebrov
- Seth Shostak
- Seymour Kneitel
- Sidney Wilcox McCuskey
- Stan Gibilisco
- Stanley Jungleib
- Steff Gruber
- Steve Jobs
- Steve Wozniak
- Steven R. Nagel
- Swami Parijnanashram III
- Ted David
- Tim Allen
- Tim Samaras
- Titu-Marius Băjenescu
- Tom Baugh
- Tom Christian
- Tony Randel
- Tsuneyoshi Yamano
- Tyrteu Rocha Vianna
- Ulrich L. Rohde
- Victor Poor
- W. A. S. Butement
- Wacław Łukaszewicz
- Walter Cronkite
- Ward Cunningham
- Warren B. Offutt
- Wasil Ahmad
- Wau Holland
- Wayne Green
- William B. Bridges
- William Elvin Jackson
- William Campbell James Meredith
- William I. Orr
- Yoritake Matsudaira
- Yuri Gagarin
- Yvette Pierpaoli
- Fritz Maytag K6FLM
