= Tsuneyoshi =

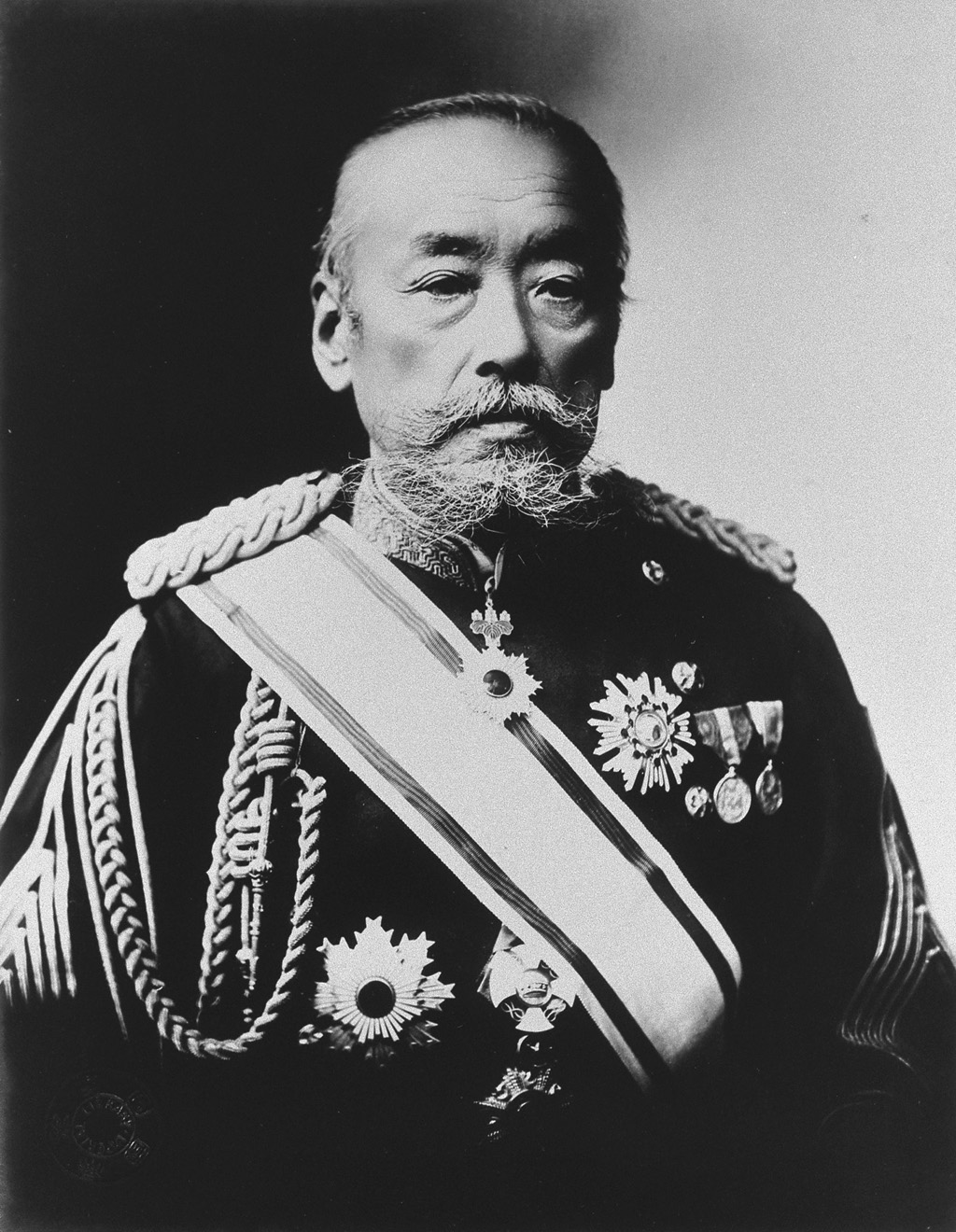
- Tsuneyoshi Murata (1838-1921), Japanese samurai, marksman, gunsmith, soldier, and military officer.
- Pronunciation: [tsɯnejoɕi]
- Gender: Male

Origin
- Origin: Japanese
- Meaning: Different meanings depending on the kanji used

Other names
- Alternative spelling: Tuneyosi (Kunrei-shiki) Tuneyosi (Nihon-shiki) Tsuneyoshi (Hepburn)

Tsuneyoshi (Japanese pronunciation: [tsɯnejoɕi]) is a masculine Japanese given name. It is also a place name dating back to the medieval Japan.

== Written forms ==
Tsuneyoshi can be written using different combinations of kanji characters. Here are some examples:

- 常義, "usual, justice"
- 常吉, "usual, good luck"
- 常善, "usual, virtuous"
- 常芳, "usual, virtuous/fragrant"
- 常良, "usual, good"
- 常能, "usual, capacity"
- 恒義, "always, justice"
- 恒吉, "always, good luck"
- 恒善, "always, virtuous"
- 恒芳, "always, virtuous/fragrant"
- 恒良, "always, good"
- 恒能, "always, capacity"
- 庸義, "common, justice"
- 庸好, "common, good/like something"
- 庸慶, "common, congratulate"
- 庸嘉, "common, excellent"
- 毎義, "every, justice"
- 毎好, "every, good/like something"
- 毎喜, "every, rejoice"

The name can also be written in hiragana つねよし or katakana ツネヨシ.

== Notable people with the name ==
- Tsuneyoshi Murata (村田 経芳, 1838-1921), Japanese samurai, swordsman, marksman, firearm inventor, gunsmith, soldier, and military officer.
- Tsuneyoshi Saito (斎藤 恒芳; born 1965), Japanese composer.
- Prince Tsuneyoshi Takeda (竹田宮恒徳王, Takeda-no-miya Tsuneyoshi-ō; 1909–1992), Japanese prince and equestrian.
- Tsuneyoshi Yamano (山野 常禎; born 1946), Japanese engineer and amateur radio operator.

== See also ==
- 17563 Tsuneyoshi, a main-belt asteroid
