= Wassail (disambiguation) =

Wassail is a drink.

It may also refer to:

- Wassail (EP), a music album by the Big Big Train
- WASSAIL, an educational measurement system

== See also ==
- Wasil (disambiguation)
- Wassailing, an English folk culture event
