= Kärkkäinen =

Kärkkäinen is a Finnish surname. Notable people with the surname include:

- Pertti Kärkkäinen (1933–2017), Finnish diplomat
- Veli-Matti Kärkkäinen (born 1958), Finnish theologian
- Katariina Souri (born 1968), Finnish author, original surname Kärkkäinen
- Pyry Kärkkäinen (born 1986), Finnish footballer
