= Devane =

Devane is a surname. Notable people with the surname include:

- Alvin Devane (1923–2012), American policeman
- Andrew Devane (1917–2000), Irish architect
- Ciarán Devane (born 1962), chief executive of the British Council
- Datta Raghoba Devane, Indian independence activist
- Jamie Devane (born 1991), Canadian ice hockey player
- Vijay Devane, Indian political activist
- William Devane (born 1939), American actor
- Harris DeVane (1963–2018), American stock car racing driver
