= Titu-Marius Băjenescu =

Romanian engineer

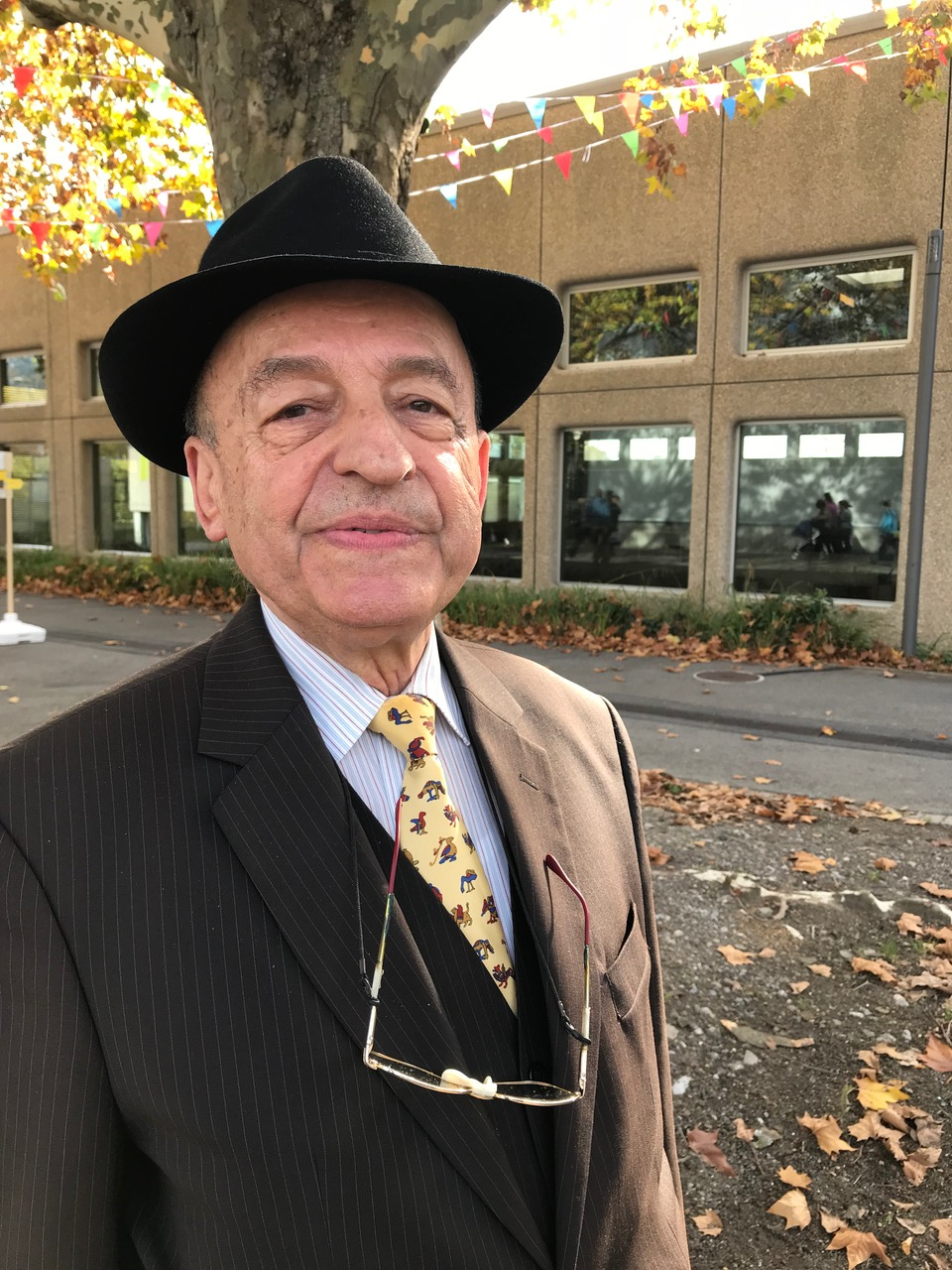
- Prof. DHC Titu-Marius Băjenescu oct. 2017
- Born: April 2, 1933; Câmpina, Prahova, Romania
- Education: Politehnica University of Bucharest
- Occupation: Electronic engineering
- Spouse: eng. Andrea Bogdan
- Children: Christine-Susanne Durand
- Parents: Col. Ioan T. Băjenescu (father); Lelia Constantza (mother)

Titu-Marius Băjenescu (born April 2, 1933, in Câmpina, Prahova, Romania) is a Romanian engineer in electronics naturalized Swiss, Doctor Honoris Causa of the Military Technical Academy of Bucharest and of the Technical University of Moldova. He specialized in the reliability of complex electronic systems and micro- and nanoelectronic components. He was awarded the "Tudor Tănăsescu" prize by the Romanian Academy.

== Biography ==
The father, Ioan T. Băjenescu (September 17, 1899, Redea, Romanați, Romania – November 17, 1987, Craiova, Dolj, county, Romania), was transmission information Colonel of the Romanian Royal Army, Commander of the Cluj-Napoca Transmission Regiment. It first emitted amateur radio signals using the call sign CV5BI, then YR5BI. In March 1926, with Dr. Alexandru Savopol, he laid the foundations for the first radio club in Romania, in Craiova. Together they built Romania's first short-wave Radio station and (in 1926) the first short-wave radio broadcast in Romania. Together with Dr. Alexandru Savopol, October 26, 1926, Second Lieutenant Ioan T. Băjenescu produced the first radio program in Romania for the general public; the program was heard throughout the territory of Oltenia and many echoes appeared in the press in all the cities of Oltenia, and even of the Timok Valley (Bulgaria).

The mother, Lelia Constanța (born May 21, 1908, Corlate, Romania; deceased December 15, 1980, Craiova, Romania), born Petrescu, was the first radio amateur woman in Romania, using her husband's call-sign YL CV5BI. Fluent in French and German, she established tens of thousands of radio links on all meridians. Unfortunately, of these QSL (which have been collected over the years as evidence of these radio links) there remains almost nothing, since, immediately after the establishment of the communist regime, they were all burned, as they were evidence of "links with enemies" outside the country.

His wife, Andrea, born Bogdan (born July 3, 1937), granddaughter of the academic professor Dr. Petru Bogdan, from the University of Iași, founder of higher education in physical chemistry in Romania, is an electronics engineer. She built the first phonetics laboratory at the University of Bucharest. After emigrating to Switzerland, she worked for four years as an engineer at Brown Boveri in the automation department.

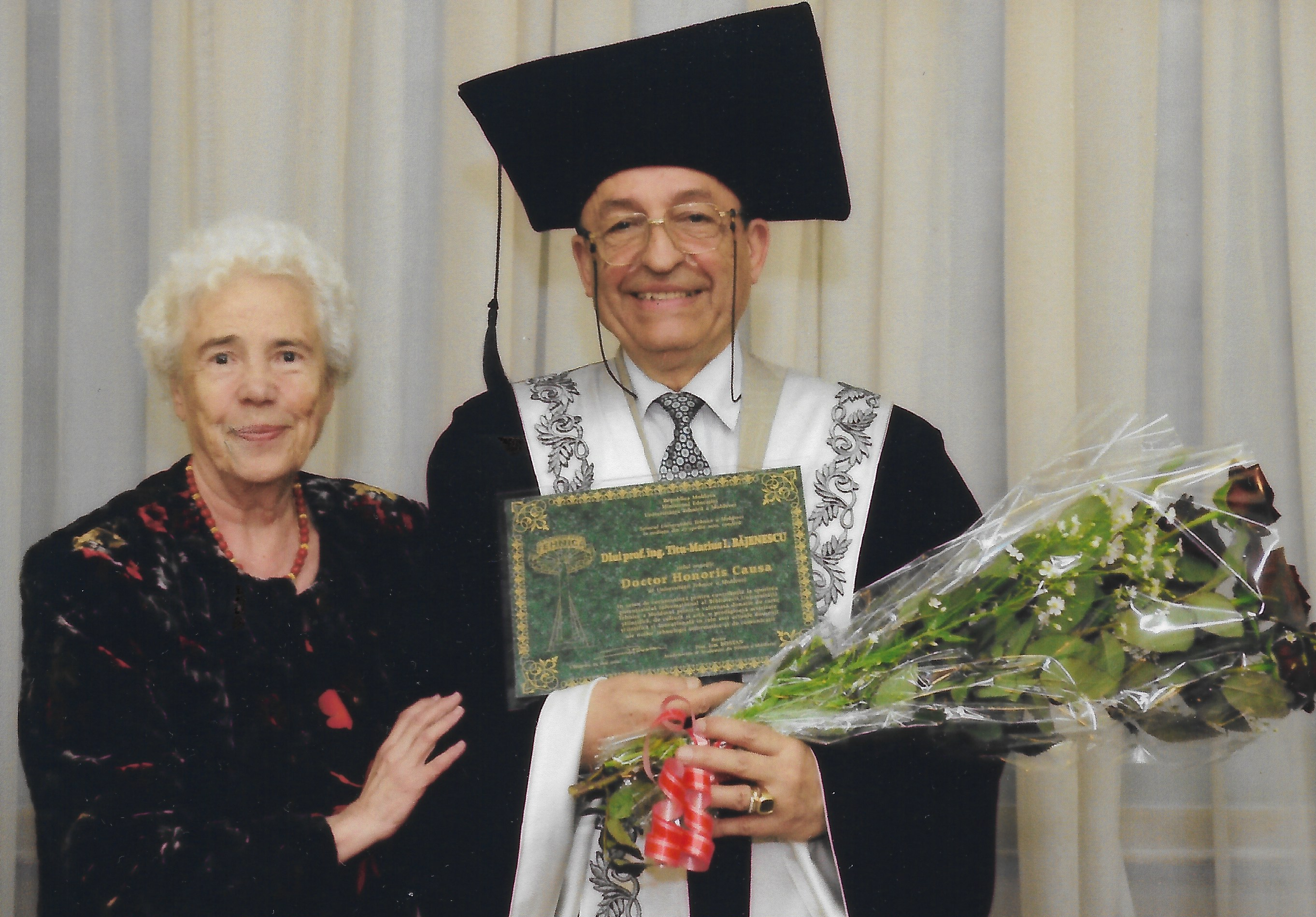
Professor DHC Titu-Marius Băjenescu and his wife Andrea at the Technical University of the Republic of Moldova (Chișinău), during the award ceremony of the honorary title, in 2010

== Studies ==
In 1951 he graduated from the college "Nicolae Bălcescu" in Craiova. At the same time as he went to secondary school, he attended the "Cornetti" Conservatory of Craiova, for violin, composition, counterpoint and orchestral conducting, with very good teachers, among others, Traian Elian, Constantin Becarian and Ion Alexandrescu. He joined the Polytechnic Institute of Bucharest, and attended the courses of the newly created Faculty of Electronics and Telecommunications, the Radiocommunication Section; he was also part of the first class of electronic engineers (1951–1956). Shortly before graduation, he designed and realized the acoustics project for the new concert hall of the Craiova "Oltenia" Philharmonic Orchestra; after the inauguration of the hall, local and central newspapers wrote that the acoustics of the concert hall were one of the most successful in South-Eastern Europe. Although he wanted to become a sound engineer at the Romanian Radio Broadcasting Company, the political barriers specific to this period did not allow him to realize his dream.

== Professional activity ==
Thanks to very good results at the diploma examination, he was appointed researcher at the Research Institute for Signals of the Romanian Army (1956–1960) then he won a competition and became researcher – later principal researcher – at the Institute of Energy of the Romanian Academy (1960–1968) where, under the direction of the eminent scientist Vasile-Mihai Popov, correspondent member of the Romanian Academy, he built the largest analogue machines in Romania: MECAN I and MECAN II. Later, by competition, he became Head of the Department of Cybernetics at the Institute for International Economic Studies of the Ministry of Foreign Trade (now the Institute of World Economy) (1968–1969); the following job was Head of the Electronics Laboratory of the Institute for Labour Protection Research (1969).

In 1968, following the presentation of a paper at a specialized congress in the Federal Republic of Germany, he received job offers on the spot from renowned western companies (Hewlett-Packard, IBM, Deutsches Elektronen Synchrotron, Brown Boveri, Tele Denmark, etc.). The Government of Romania chose the offer of the Swiss company Brown Boveri because Romania had just bought the licence for the manufacture of diesel electric locomotives.

Then there was a period when he held various positions in large western companies:

- 1969–1974 – Senior Engineer in the Telecommunications Research and Development Department of Brown Boveri & Co, Baden, Switzerland;
- 1974–1980 – Chief engineer for reliability problems at HASLER AG, the largest Swiss telecom company at the time;
- 1980–1985 – Head of telecommunications department of a large Swiss bank based in Lausanne;
- Chief engineer of a Swiss subsidiary (MTC Optoelektronik und Messtechnik) of the German giant MBB (Messerschmitt – Bolkow, Munich Blohm)
- 1985–1987 – Electronics consultant to Dr. Bölkow at the company's headquarters in Ottobrunn;
- 1987–1990 – Head of the research department of the Swiss company Telecolumbus;
- 1990–1994 – Adviser on telecommunications, regulatory and financial matters to President Jacques Attali, founder of the European Bank for Reconstruction and Development (EBRD) in London; here he designed the digital overlay network for Romania's telecommunications project and signed, in 1991, as project manager – on behalf of the EBRD – to grant a first loan to Romania, worth US$250 million, out of a total of US$750 million;
- Since 1981, he has been an international expert and consultant in management, telematics, telecommunications, reliability and quality in electronics, micro and nanoelectronics.
- Since 1974, he has been a lecturer, then professor at the universities of Bern, Zürich, Düsseldorf, Vienna, Munich, Lausanne, Essen, Cluj-Napoca, Bucharest, Braşov, Iaşi.

== Member in societies and associations ==
- Senior member of the well-known IEEE
- Member of the New York Academy of Sciences;
- Member of the Swiss Association of Engineers;
- Member of the Swiss Association of Specialized Journalists.

== Awards and decorations ==
He was declared “The man of the year 2008” by the American Biographical Institute.

For all his activity during a lifetime, the Military Technical Academy of Romania awarded him the title of Doctor Honoris Causa during a moving ceremony, where were also mentioned the feats of arms and the particular merits of his father, the Colonel of transmissions Ioan T. Băjenescu (May 14, 2008). On this occasion, he presented the communication entitled "FIDES – a new method for assessing the reliability of electronic components which take account of new technologies". FIDES was initiated by the French DGA (Délégation générale pour l'Armement) and carried out by a European consortium of eight defence and aeronautics manufacturers.

For his work in the field of reliability and telematics, as well as for the donation of his personal library containing thousands of books, technical and scientific journals in five languages, in 2010, the Technical University of the Republic of Moldova (Chişinău) awarded him the title of Doctor Honoris Causa. During this solemnity, Titu-Marius Băjenescu made a presentation on "Problems and progress in the reliability of electronic micro- and nanosystems".

== Published works ==
=== Articles ===
He has published more than 500 works, as author or co-author, in prestigious specialized journals in Europa, USA, and in Romania. Some of these works are frequently cited in the bibliography of many master and / or doctoral theses. He has held numerous postgraduate conferences in the main European academic centres and has presented the results of his own research at conferences. He has been invited to numerous international conferences, symposia, workshops, etc. to present papers on well-defined topics or to chair sections of these scientific events. In 1994–1995, he was editor-in-chief of the international journal Telematik Spektrum, with contributions in English, German and French.

=== Books ===
He is the author of 37 specialized books, published in four languages.

- The construction of the tape recorder, Tehnica Editions, Bucharest, 1959
- Initiation à la fiabilité en électronique moderne, Masson-Paris and Arm editions, Switzerland, 1978
- Elektronik und Zuverlässigkeit, Hallwag Verlag, Bern and Stuttgart, 1979
- Problems of reliability of current active electronic components, (Masson-Paris and Arm editions, Switzerland, 1980) preface by Prof. Guy Peyrache, chairman of the TC56 technical committee "Reliability and maintainability" of the IEC (International Electrotechnical Commission), in which Titu-Marius represented Switzerland
- Zuverlässigkeit elektronischer Komponenten, VDE-Verlag, 1985
- Mikroelektronik 89. Berichte der Informationstagung ME 89, joint author H. Arnold, J. Baier, Springer Verlag, 1989, ISBN 978-3-211-82171-8
- Datenkommunikationsnetzwerke, heute und morgen, Expert Verlag, 1994, ISBN 978-3-8169-0984-2
- Reliability of electronic components, Foreword Prof. Dr. Ioan C. Bacivarov, Tehnica Editions, Bucharest, 1996, ISBN 973-31-0567-8
- Handbuch der Telematik Akronyme und Abkürzungen, Fachpresse Goldach Verlag, 1996
- Management of modern telecommunication networks: network architecture, standardization, security aspects, network management, network installation, operation / maintenance, Preface Prof. Dr. Eng. Adelaida Mateescu, Teora Editions, 1998, ISBN 973-601-850-4
- Reliability of Electronic Components. A Practical Guide to Electronic Systems Manufacturing, co-author Marius Bâzu, Springer Verlag, Berlin, 1999, ISBN 978-3-642-63625-7
- Personal Communication Systems, Teora Editions, 2000, ISBN 9732002360
- Distributed "intelligence" and services in telecommunication networks. Réseaux intelligents, éditions Tehnica, Bucharest, 2001, ISBN 973-31-2047-2
- XDSL technologies and "fast" multimedia internet, Tehnica Editions, Bucharest, 2001, ISBN 9733120359
- Computer Security and Telecommunications, co-author Monica Borda, Dacia Editions, Cluj-Napoca, 2001, ISBN 973-35-1208-7
- Performances of Artificial Intelligence – From Theory to Applications, Albastră Editions, Cluj-Napoca, 2002, ISBN 973-650-070-5-1
- Contributions à l'histoire de l'informatique suisse, Matrix Rom Publishing, Bucharest, 2003, ISBN 9736856291
- Satellite Communications, Matrix Rom Editions, Bucharest, 2003, ISBN 973-685-633-X
- Reliability of Technical Systems, Matrix Rom Editions, Bucharest, 2003, ISBN 973-685-624-0
- Broadband communications. Technical, economic, political and social issues, Matrix Rom Editions, Bucarest, 2003, ISBN 973-685-706-9
- Advances in Computer Science, Cryptography and Telecommunications in the twentieth century, Matrix Rom Publishing House, Bucharest, 2003, ISBN 9736856232
- Power of Multimedia Communication, Albastră Editions, 2004, Cluj-Napoca
- Aspects of reliability of electronic components and systems, Matrix Rom Editions, 2006, Bucharest, ISBN 978-973-755-062-0
- The Internet, the information society and the knowledge society, preface by Professor Dr. Vasile Baltac, Matrix Rom Editions, 2006, Bucharest, ISBN 978-973-755-115-3
- Component Reliability for Electronic Systems, co-author Marius Bâzu, Artech House, 2009, Boston and London, ISBN 9781596934368
- Failure Analysis: A Practical Guide for Manufacturers of Electronic Components and Systems, co-author Marius Bâzu, John Wiley & Sons, 2011, ISBN 9780470748244
- Failure mechanisms of electronic components, co-author Marius Bâzu, Matrix Rom Editions, 2012, Bucharest, ISBN 978-973-755-773-5
- Zuverlässige Bauelemente für elektronische Systeme, Springer Publishing House, 2019, ISBN 978-3-658-22177-5

In December 2013, the Romanian Academy awarded him the "Tudor Tănăsescu" prize for the book "Failure Analysis" published by John Wiley & Sons in 2011 [15]. It is an original volume with an innovative character, published with Marius Bâzu; foreword signed by Prof. Dr. André Kleyner (Global Reliability Leader at Delphi Corporation, USA) and a preface by Craig Hillman, CEO of DfR Solutions (USA).

=== Passion for music ===
Being a lover of classical music and great admirer of Georges Enesco, genius of Romanian music, he assumed the great responsibility to fill a void in German specialized literature; he wrote the first monograph of Enesco in German. The monograph "Liebe ist eine ernste und endgültige Sache – das Leben des Tonkünstlers George Enescu", with a foreword by Ioan Holender, director of the Vienna State Opera, was published in 2006 by "Henschel Verlag", thanks to a grant from the Wintershall Erdgas Handelshaus in Zug (Switzerland).

In the same year 2006, was published in Paris at "Les 3 Orangers" the work "Georges Enesco – le cœur de la musique roumaine", with a preface written by the composer and pianist Alexandre Hrisanide, professor at the music department of the universities of Tilburg and Amsterdam. The book was published with the financial support of two French fans of Enesco music: Claire and Majdi Benchoukroun-Lombard.

The book "A life dedicated to music: George Enescu" was published in 2004 at the Budapest publishing house "Bridge", sponsored by the Austrian company S&T.

He has published musical reviews in various Swiss and Romanian magazines and newspapers.

== Sources ==
- Băjenescu I. Titu-Marius, CV extins
- Dicționarul specialiștilor vol. I, Ed. Tehnică, 1996;
- Fănuș Băileșteanu, in Români celebri din străinătate, Ed. România Press, București, 2005, pp. 38–39;
- Ingineri români. Dicționar enciclopedic, vol.II, Ed. Mega, Cluj-Napoca, 2018, pp. 79–80, ISBN 978-606-543-945-0
