= Picker (surname) =

Picker is a surname found in the English-speaking world. Many people with this surname are Jewish and emigrated, or are descendants of those who emigrated, from parts of eastern Europe, including current-day Russia, Belarus, Ukraine and Poland, in the late 1800s and early 1900s. The surname is principally derived from the Yiddish word for the occupation "baker" and is synonymous with the surnames Peker, Baker, and Becker since the letters "p" and "b" have the same Yiddish pronunciation.

== People with this surname ==
- Arnold Picker (1913–1989), American film industry executive
- David V. Picker (1931–2019), American motion picture executive and producer
- Harvey Picker (1915–2008), American businessman, educator, inventor, and philanthropist
- Joe Picker (b. 1987), Australian rugby league player
- Lester Picker (radio operator) (1905–1930), American amateur radio operator; district superintendent of the American Radio Relay League
- Tobias Picker (b. 1954), American composer

== See also ==
- Picker (disambiguation) for other meanings
- Pickering (surname)
- Baker (surname)
- Becker (surname)
