= Wasil =

Wasil may refer to:

- Wasil (Sufism), a rank in Sufism

== People ==
- Wasil ibn Ata, a Muslim theologian and jurist
- Wasil Ahmad, Afghan child soldier
- Stephen Wasil, American football quarterback

== See also ==
- Wassail (disambiguation)
