= Rik Jaeken =

Belgian businessman (born 1949)

- Born: 1949 (age 76–77); Bocholt, Belgium
- Occupation: Businessman
- Known for: President of UNIZO (1999–2007)
- Title: Baron

Rik, Baron Jaeken (born 1949) is a Belgian businessman from Bocholt who resides in Zonhoven. He served as the president of UNIZO, the organization for the self-employed and SMEs in Flanders, from 1999 to 2007, when he was succeeded by Flor Joosen.

== Career ==
Jaeken is an engineer and the president of a company that sells and maintains yachts. He is also the vice-president of Trias, an organization that promotes entrepreneurship in developing countries.

== Personal life ==
Jaeken is an amateur radio operator with the call sign ON1BJI. He is a member of the North-East Limburg (NOL) section of the Royal Union of Belgian Radio Amateurs (UBA).
