= Picker =

Picker may refer to:

- Picker (surname), including a list of people so named
- A farmworker at harvest time
- Picker, a slang word for a player of a string instrument such as a guitar or banjo
- A common job title for order picking in a warehouse
- A person who finds valuable items in other people's junk, as featured in the TV show American Pickers

== See also ==
- Pick (disambiguation)
- Piquer (disambiguation)
