= Mońki =

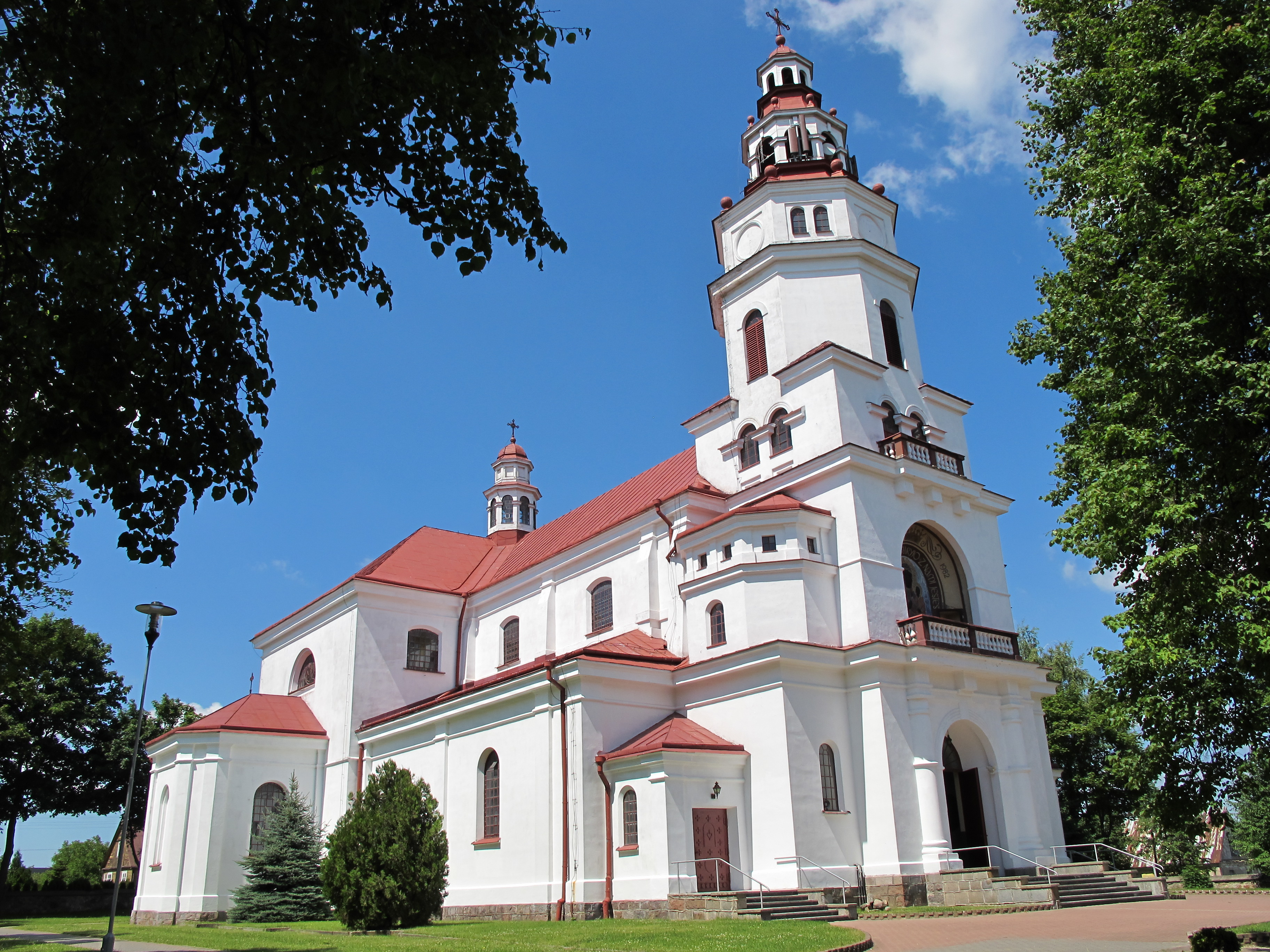
- The parish church

- Flag Coat of arms

- Location within Poland
- Coordinates: 53°24′N 22°48′E
- Country: Poland
- Voivodeship: Podlaskie
- County: Mońki
- Gmina: Mońki
- Established: 16th century
- Town rights: 1965

Government
  - Mayor: Zbigniew Karwowski

Area
  - Total: 7.66 km^{2} (2.96 sq mi)

Population (2011)
  - Total: 10 460
  - Density: 1.3/km^{2} (3.4/sq mi)
- Time zone: UTC+1 (CET)
  - Summer (DST): UTC+2 (CEST)
- Postal code: 19-100, 19-101
- Area code: +48 85
- Car plates: BMN
- Website: http://um-monki.pl

Mońki [ˈmɔɲkʲi] is a town in the Podlaskie Voivodeship, in northeastern Poland. It is the capital of Mońki County.

== History ==
In the 16th century, Mońki was a village owned by the Mońko family. In the 19th century, when building railroad from Grodno was in progress, in the neighborhood of Mońki a train station was built. Following World War I, Catholic church was built.

Following the German-Soviet invasion of Poland, which started World War II in September 1939, the town was initially occupied by the Soviet Union until 1941, followed by Nazi Germany until 1944. In the late World War II Germans destroyed the church. Following World War II, Mońki was restored to Poland under the Polish People's Republic until the Fall of Communism in Poland in the 1980s. The Polish anti-communist resistance was active in Mońki, and in 1945 it raided a local communist police station.

In 1954, the village was adopted as capital of the Mońki County. That increased development of the village and in 1965 Mońki became a city. In 1975 the county was abolished, and then reestablished in 1999 (1998). From 1975 to 1998 it was part of the Białystok Voivodeship (1975–1998).

== Symbols ==
Mońki's coat of arms presents a lady with potatoes. It is connected with an old type of farming in Mońki village and it neighbourhood. In city (also in 2012) was organised a day of potato.

Many of Mońki's inhabitants have moved abroad, particularly to the US, so they can send remittances to their families.

== Economy ==
In Mońki existed especially food enterprises. The largest is Moniecka Spółdzielnia Mleczarska (dairy).

== Education ==
In Mońki existed two primary school (one connected with first grade music school), gymnasium. general liceum, technikum and szkoła zawodowa.

== Transport ==
Through Mońki goes droga krajowa 65 (road), connecting city with Białystok and Grajewo.

== Export ==
Several tech companies have risen during the last 10 years.

== Tourism ==
Near Mońki there are some of the greatest swamps in Europe, the Biebrza River Swamps, and in 1993 the government created the Biebrza National Park (BNP) to recognise and protect their unique nature. The Biebrza River Swamps are an important habitat for rare birds such as the ruff (pol. batalion), which is a symbol of the BNP.

== Notable people ==
- Maria Janion (1926-2020), literary critic and feminist
- Józef Piotr Klim (born 1960), politician
- Wacław Łukaszewicz (1927-2014), scout leader
- Katarzyna Żakowicz (born 1975), shot putter

== Gallery ==
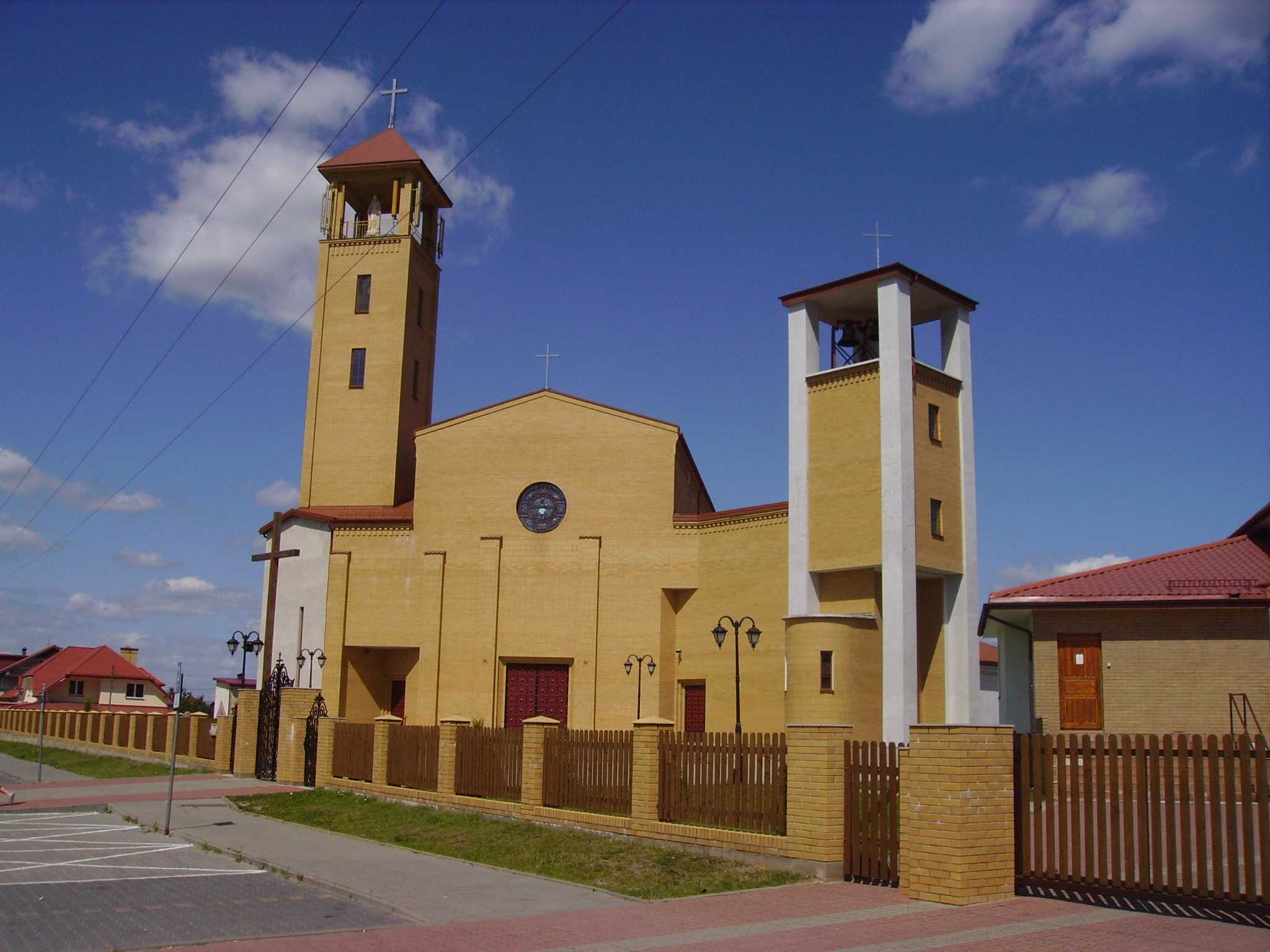
Church - św. Brata Alberta

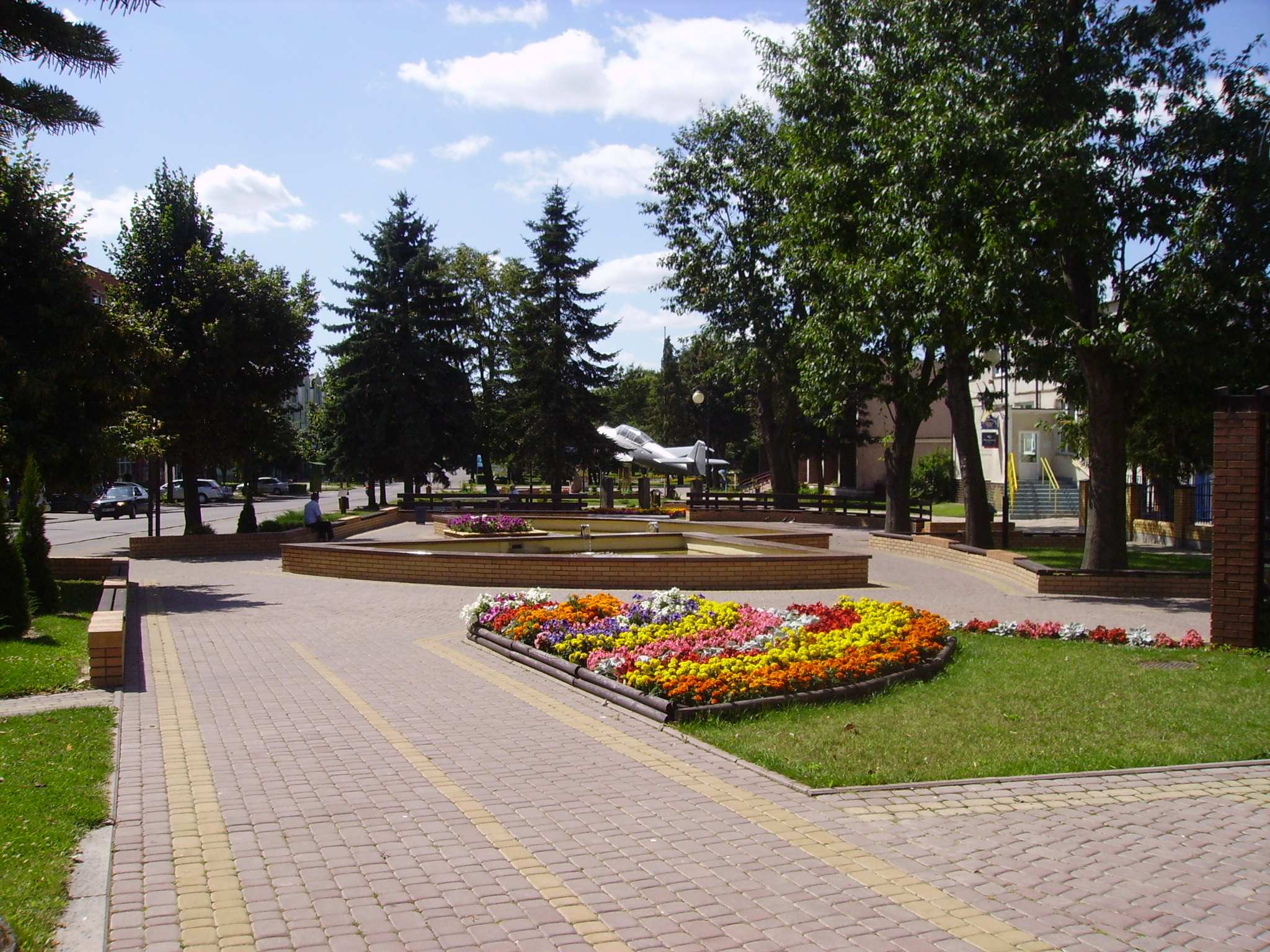
Park - square

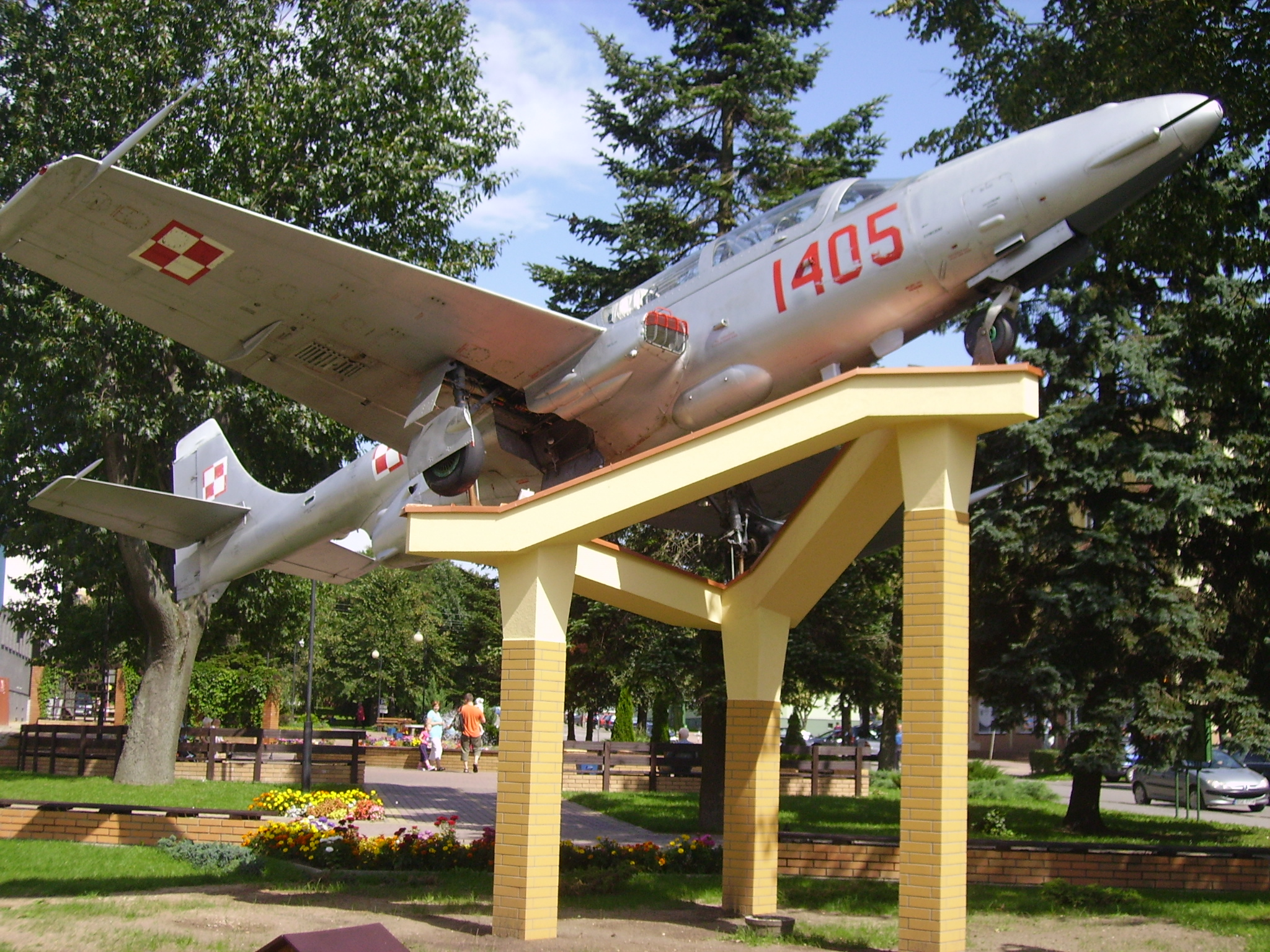
Airplane Monument

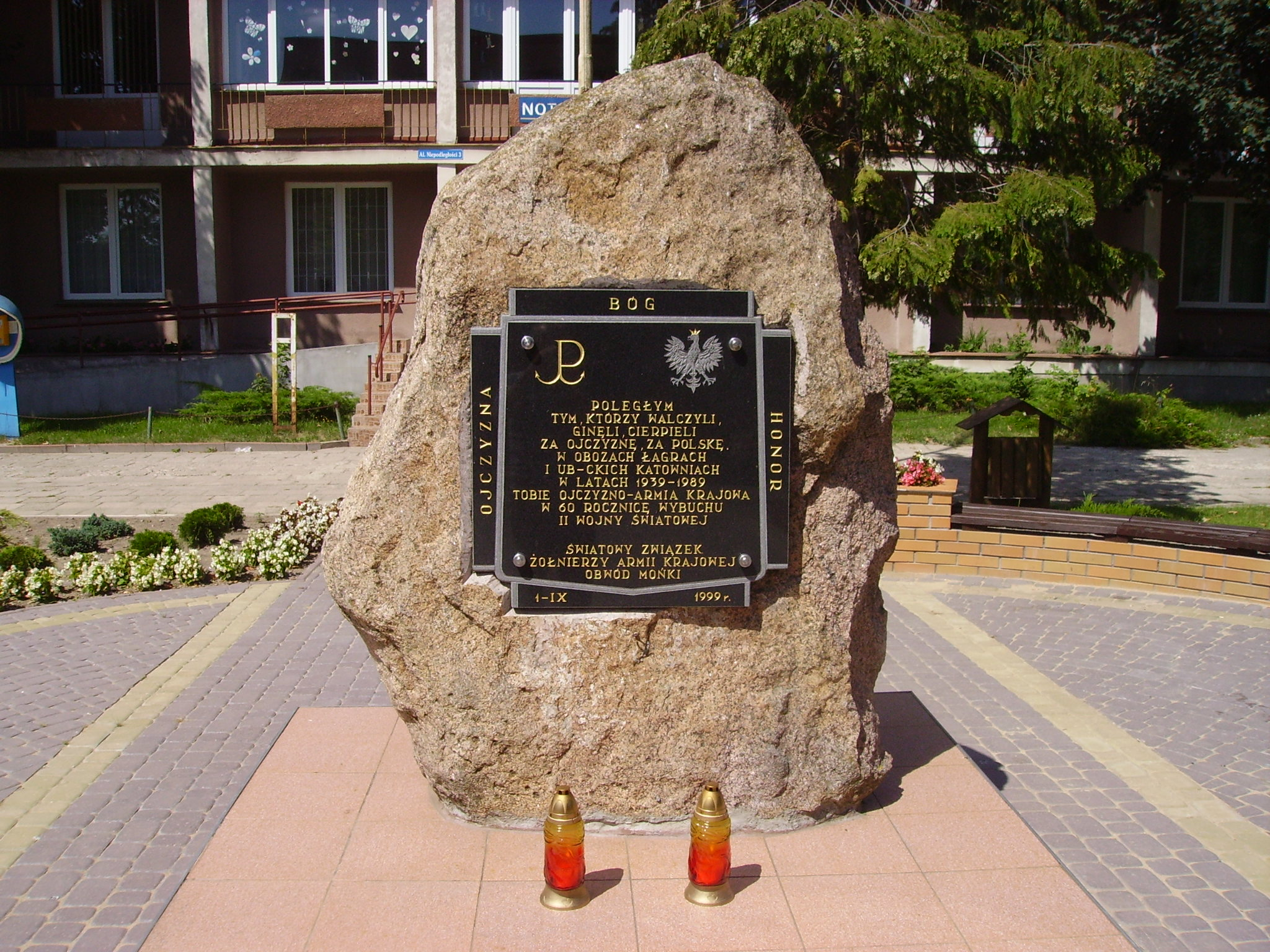
Monument to Armia Krajowa, Mońki

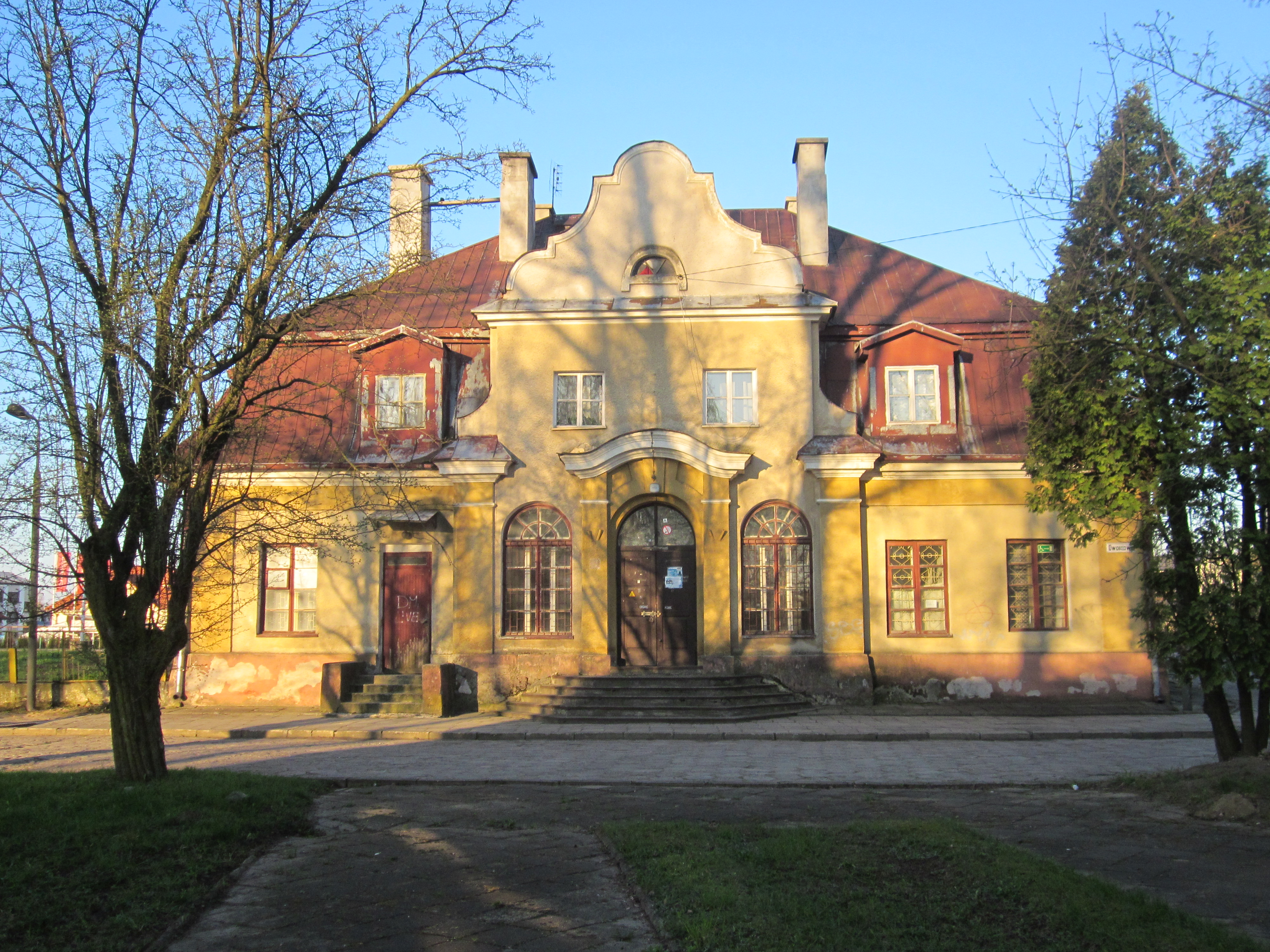
The railway station from 1930s

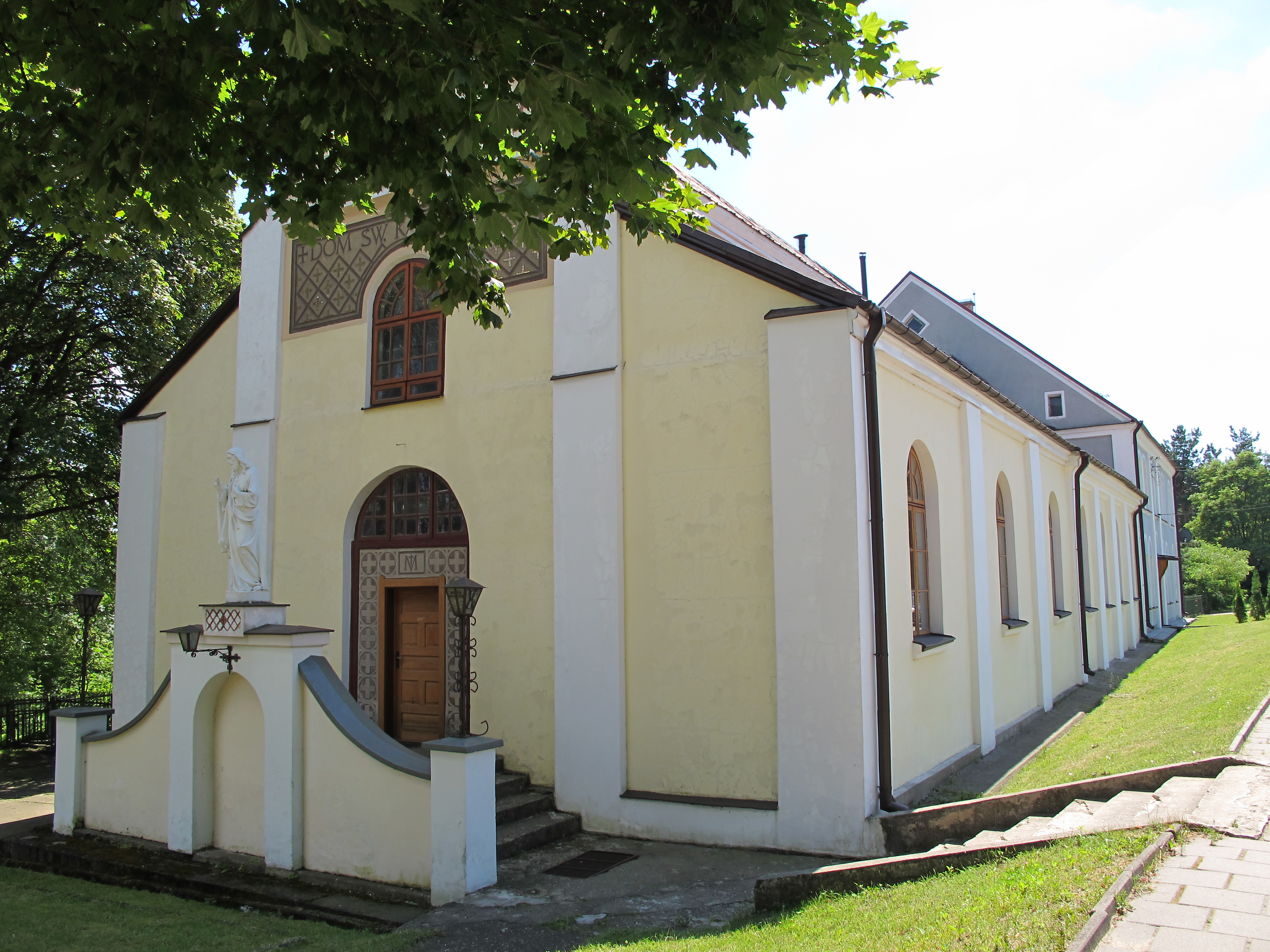
Saint Casimir chapel
