= E. W. Bedford =

E. W. Bedford (21 December 1892 – 1972) was a British-born Ceylon tea planter.

Bedford was born on 21 December 1892 at Forest Gate, Essex (now in London), England. He came to Ceylon to join the tea plantation at Kandaloya, Dolosbage, where he was Assistant Superintendent from 1917 until 1923. He was commissioned as an officer to the British Army Indian Army Reserve at Bangalore from 15 January 1918 until 27 May 1918 at the War History Training School. He was later attached to the 3rd Sappers and Miners in Khyber Pass on 26 June 1919.

After his time in the army, he returned to Kandaloya to continue his work as a planter. From 1920 to 1930 he was the owner and manager of Tebuwatte Estate; while he was there he also looked after Oonankande Estate in Dolosbage. After the 1930 sale of Tebuwatte, he managed Oonankanda, adding to it with the 1949 purchase of Gangawaraliya & Hyderabad Estates. He continued managing both estates until 1953.

Bedford was also part of the World Amateur Ham Radio Association, and actively participated as an amateur radio operator. He was appointed Justice of Peace and unofficial Magistrate for Kegalle District in the 1950s. Bedford died in 1972, prior to his death he marked his own grave in Gangawaraliya Estate. After his death, Gangawaraliaya was transferred to his children.

== Estates managed and owned by Bedford ==
Estate	Years and position	Acreage
Kandaloya	1913–1923 Asst Manager	1240
Tebbuwatta	1920–1930 Owner-Manager	138
Nagastene	1920–1921 Manager	283
Oonankande	1925–1953 Manager	387
Gangawaraliya	1925–1949 Manager; 1949–1972 Owner-Manager	532
Dotel Oya	1957–1959 Manager	1282
Hyderabad	1949–1963 Owner	314
