= William Elvin Jackson =

William Elvin Jackson (1904–1972) was an aviation electronics engineer who contributed to the fields of aeronautical navigation, communications and air traffic control. Jackson assisted in the development of nearly all of the electronic aids to air navigation and air traffic control during his careers in both industry and government. Those contributions included the advancement of instrument landing systems (ILS), very high frequency omni-ranges (VHFOR), and distance measuring equipment, all of which are the worldwide standard systems in use today.

Jackson was the editor of "The Federal Airways System," a publication of the Institute of Electrical and Electronics Engineers (IEEE) that traces 40 years of technical engineering achievements that enabled the prevalence of air transportation in public inter-city, intercontinental and international private and business travel.

William Jackson graduated from Brown University in Providence, Rhode Island. The 1925 Brown University Yearbook foreshadowed his future:

William Elvin Jackson "Bill": Back in 1921, Bill packed his radio set and took the train for Providence. He early acquired an enduring devotion for English 49, but his real hobby is staying up until four A.M. Bill may usually be discovered confounding with the electrical engineering professors with some new problem on radiation resistance. Some day, Bill, we hope to see your name in the magazine of American Radio Engineers as the foremost advancer of that pastime, during the century.

In the mid-1920s, Jackson, while living in Schenectady, New York, was a central part of a worldwide group of thousands of experimenting wireless engineers, referred to as "hams". They used ham radios and Morse code to communicate among themselves between 42 countries, all in an effort to improve code transmission when two-way communication was the first wireless technology. At the time, he was employed with General Electric in its radio department.
