= Józef Piotr Klim =

Polish politician

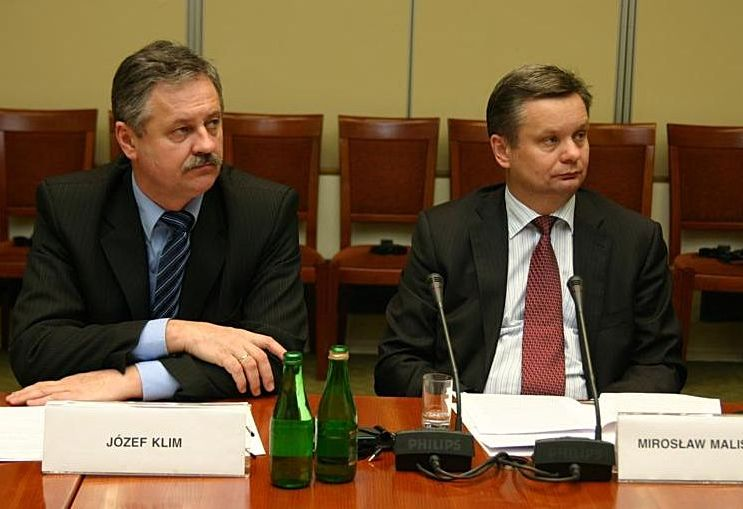

Member of the Sejm
- Incumbent
- Assumed office 25 September 2005
- Constituency: 24 – Białystok

Personal details
- Born: 19 October 1960 (age 65)
- Party: Civic Platform

Józef Piotr Klim (born 19 October 1960 in Mońki) is a Polish politician. He was elected to Sejm on 25 September 2005 getting 7815 votes in 24 – Białystok for Civic Platform. Józef became a headmaster of Liceum Ogólnokształcące Politechniki Białostockiej in 2018.

== See also ==
- Members of Polish Sejm 2005-2007
