= Theodor V. Ionescu =

Romanian physicist and inventor

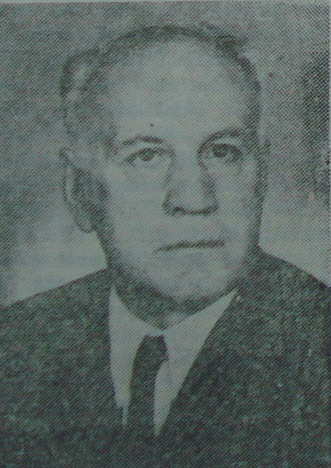
- Theodor V. Ionescu in Bucharest, 1970
- Born: February 8, 1899; Dorohoi, Botoșani County, Kingdom of Romania
- Died: November 6, 1988 (aged 89); Bucharest, Socialist Republic of Romania
- Citizenship: Romania
- Education: Paris-Sorbonne University; University of Iași; University of Bucharest
- Known for: plasma physics magnetic resonance first maser studies magnetron invention 3D cinematography/TV devices coupled electron-ion oscillations in ultra-hot plasmas nuclear fusion in ultra-hot hydrogen plasmas
- Scientific career
- Fields: Physics
- Doctoral advisor: Petru Bogdan

Theodor V. Ionescu (February 8, 1899 – November 7, 1988) was a Romanian physicist and inventor who made remarkable discoveries in plasma physics, ionosphere physics, ion coupling electrons in dense plasmas, masers, magnetron amplifiers, and Zeeman effects related to controlled nuclear fusion and quantum emission mechanisms in hot plasmas. He was a member of the Romanian Academy from December 21, 1935.

== Ph.D. studies in plasma physics ==
He received his Ph.D. in plasma physics, first in Paris at Paris-Sorbonne University, and then in Iași. Thus, the history of plasma physics in Romania began in 1923 with the defense of the first PhD thesis in physics at the University of Iași by Ionescu, under the guidance of Petru Bogdan. Ionescu carried out the first experimental studies in Romania of the physics of ionized gases/plasmas.

== Scientific achievements and collaborators ==
In 1925 invented a microphone based on thermionic currents (currents emitted by heated bodies) and a light projector using the interference phenomenon.

Founded in the same year the first Electricity and Magnetism Laboratory, as well as the first Chair of Electricity and Magnetism in the Department of Mathematics and Physics at the University of Bucharest.

=== The first prototype of a precursor to the magnetron power amplifier ===
He built in 1934–1935 a precursor to the high-power, multi-cavity magnetron that was built subsequently, in 1937–1940, by the British physicist, Sir John Turton Randall, FRSE together with a team of British coworkers for the British and American, military radar installations in WWII. At the same time, the Telefunken Company of Berlin was 'searching' for such a device but has apparently met with much less success than the British inventors or Th. V. Ionescu. (However, the split anode magnetron had first been developed in 1921 by Dr. A.E.Hull at General Electric Company in USA; also in 1921, Ernst Haban, who was working in Germany, developed a similar device that worked on a 3 cm wavelength. A strong competitor of the former inventors was also Dr. H.E.Hollman who registered many patents between 1925 and 1935 that documented devices related to magnetron development).

=== Patents ===
In 1936, he obtained a patent for the 3D imaging in cinema and television. In 1946, together with physicist V. Mihu invented and built a maser-type device.

=== Discoveries ===
He worked in the early 1960s in the Laboratory of the Bucharest Institute of Plasma Physics together with his childhood friend, Octav Gheorghiu, whom he greatly respected for his exceptional human qualities. They studied systematically the resonant frequencies of molecular oxygen and hydrogen ions. Then, they published their most important experimental results in a series of articles in C. R. Acad. Sci. Paris.(pp. 245, 898, 957, 246, pp. 2250, 3598, 1958, 250, 2182 p. 1960, 252, p. 870, 1961) and Rev Roum. Phys.

In the early 1970s, together with physicists Radu Pârvan and J. C. Băianu - one of his Ph.D. research assistants in plasma physics in magnetic fields in the Electricity Department of the Faculty of Physics, Bucharest – Ionescu completed experiments on controlled magnetic resonance oscillations in ultra-hot plasmas. These seminal experiments involved the coupling of ionic and electronic oscillations in ultra-hot plasma, utilizing quantum-amplified stimulation processes in the presence of longitudinal magnetic fields. This opened up novel possibilities for achieving hot nuclear fusion in the future (Achieving nuclear fusion in high pressure hot plasma). The first report of these research results was presented at the French Academy of Science in Paris by Louis Néel, member of the Academy and Nobel Prize in Physics for Magnetism. Additional results were then published in the same year in the internationally renowned magazine C. R. Acad. Sci. Paris.

His successor as Head of Department in 1970 was Florin Ciorăscu, "imported" from the IFA, (who died in 1977 during the major earthquake in Bucharest).
