= Cozmești, Iași =

Cozmești
- Commune
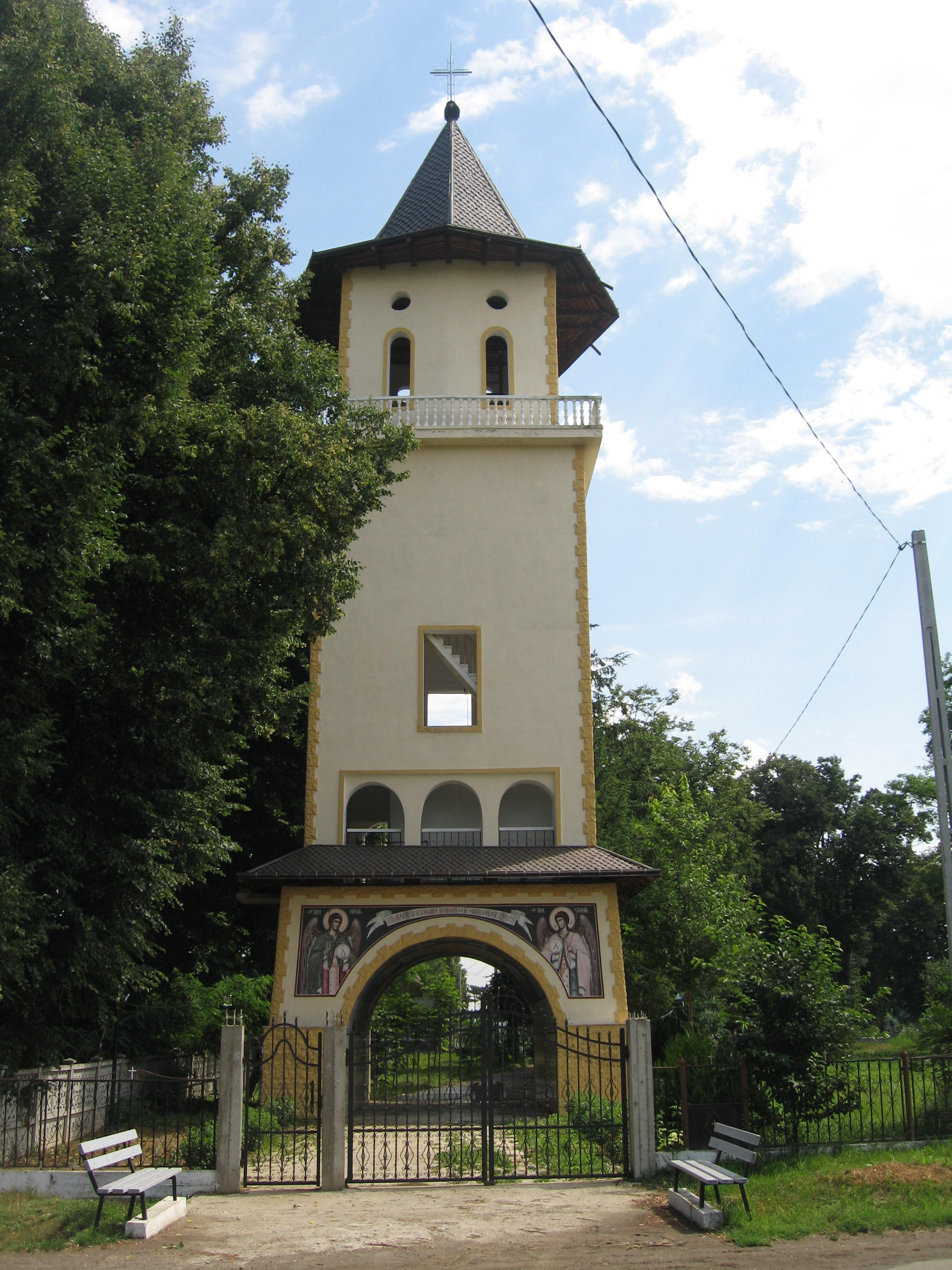
- Sfinții Voievozi Church in Cozmești

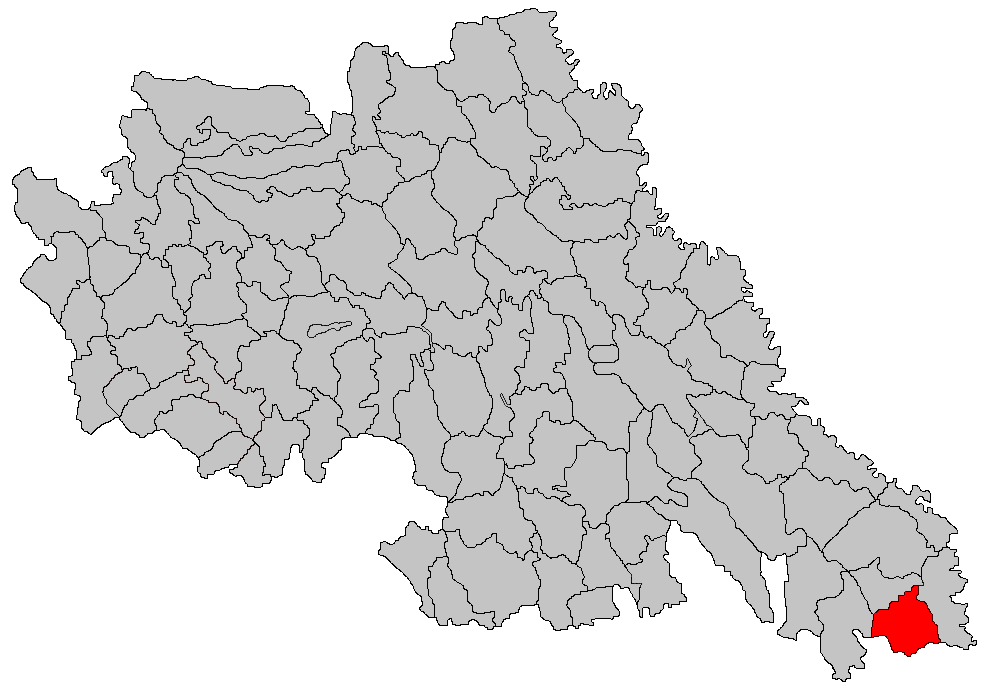
- Location in Iași County

- Location in Romania
- Coordinates: 46°53′N 27°59′E
- Country: Romania
- County: Iași

Government
  - Mayor (2020–2024): Petrică Baltag (PSD)
- Area: 38 km^{2} (15 sq mi)
- Elevation: 123 m (404 ft)
- Population (2021-12-01): 2,285
  - Density: 60/km^{2} (160/sq mi)
- Time zone: UTC+02:00 (EET)
  - Summer (DST): UTC+03:00 (EEST)
- Postal code: 707140
- Area code: +(40) 232
- Vehicle reg.: IS
- Website: www.comunacozmesti.ro

Cozmești is a commune in Iași County, Western Moldavia, Romania. It is composed of three villages: Cozmești, Podolenii de Jos, and Podolenii de Sus.

The Sturdza Palace from Cozmești village was built in neo-Gothic style in 1816 by the treasurer Grigoraș Sturdza, based on plans drawn by the architect Iosif Demesovic. Mihail Sturdza, the ruler of Moldavia between 1834 and 1849, built a second floor of the palace. The estate was inherited in 1884 by his son, Grigore Sturdza. Currently, the palace hosts a youth placement center.

The Sfinții Voievozi Church is also located in the village of Cozmești; it was built between 1901 and 1908, and was consecrated on April 5, 1909. The church was included in 2015 on the list of historical monuments from Iași County.

== Natives ==
- Petru Bogdan
