= Young Ladies Radio League =

Young Ladies' Radio League, Inc.
- Abbreviation: YLRL
- Formation: 1939
- Type: Non-profit organization
- Region served: Worldwide
- Members: 400
- President: Vicki Zumwalt, N6KLS
- Affiliations: American Radio Relay League
- Website: ylrl.net

The Young Ladies Radio League (YLRL) is an international non-profit organization of women amateur radio enthusiasts. It was founded in 1939 and is affiliated with the American Radio Relay League. The term "Young Lady" derives from a Morse code abbreviation, YL, that is used to refer to female amateur radio operators, regardless of age. (As male operators of any age are addressed as OM or "old man", the non-licensed spouse of an OM is often called an XYL.)

The Young Ladies' Radio League welcomes all licensed amateur radio women as members. The YLRL is organized into 10 districts in the United States (that correspond to the 10 amateur radio call sign districts), a district for Canada, and a "DX" district that covers the rest of the world. The YLRL holds a tri-annual convention at various locations.

== Services ==
The YLRL provides many services for its members including publishing a bimonthly newsletter, YL Harmonics. They used to provide an audio tape version of YL Harmonics for sight-impaired members but no longer do so. YL Harmonics is designed so that sight-impaired members can use a screen reader or accessibility features in pdf files. There are three scholarships granted to worthy YLs to continue their higher education with priority given for students whose majors are in communications and electronics or related arts and sciences.

== Contests ==
The YLRL sponsors several amateur radio contests throughout the year. Among these are the YL-OM in February and the DX-NA-YL Contest in October.
