= Dalton Pritchard =

American electrical engineer (1921–2010)

Dalton H. Pritchard (September 1, 1921 – April 18, 2010), was one of the early color television systems pioneers, working at RCA Laboratories.

== Early life ==
Dalton Pritchard earned a BSEE degree in Electronics from Mississippi State University in 1943. He received specialized radar training at Harvard University and MIT when he entered the U.S. Army Signal Corps, then served as captain in the Asiatic-Pacific Theater during World War II. He was awarded the Bronze Star Medal.

== RCA career ==
In 1946, Pritchard joined RCA Laboratories as a Member of the Technical Staff at Riverhead, NY, where he was engaged in communications research. In 1950 he transferred to RCA laboratories, Princeton, NJ. There his research involved many aspects of color television systems development: receivers, color kinescopes, transmitting encoders, cameras, and magnetic recording of TV. This work included the planning and testing of systems and circuits proposed for adoption by the National Television System Committee (NTSC).

Between 1960 and 1970, Pritchard worked on video processing circuitry for color TV receivers, colorimetry and decoder matrix methods, information display techniques, and analog techniques employing charge-coupled devices for TV applications. He also worked on Selectavision VideoDisc development. As a member of the Television Research Laboratory, he was involved in research related to high-definition TV (HDTV) systems that included applications of digital signal processing techniques.

== Awards ==
Pritchard received seven RCA Laboratories Outstanding Achievement Awards. He is a Fellow of the IEEE and of SID and member of Sigma Xi, Tau Beta Pi, and Kappa Mu Epsilon. He is listed in American Men and Women of Science and in Who's Who in the East.

In 1975 he was appointed a Fellow of the Technical Staff, RCA laboratories.

In 1977, he received the Vladimir K. Zworykin Award for "significant contributions to color television technology" at the IEEE Consumer Electronics Spring Conference, Chicago.

In 1981, he was a team member recipient of the David Sarnoff Award for Outstanding Technical Achievement, "for the development and implementation of a CCD comb filter integrated circuit in color TV receivers." Also in 1981, Pritchard was the only American among nine corecipients of the international Eduard Rhein Prize 1980, presented in Berlin, and was cited for numerous contributions in the field of video techniques and particularly as a leader in the development of the Dynamic Detail Processor employed in RCA ColorTrak receivers. He was appointed a member of the New Jersey Governor's state panel of Science Advisers.

In 1983, Pritchard was elected to membership in the U.S. National Academy of Engineering (NAE).

== Patents ==
Pritchard held 54 U.S. patents.

== Death ==
Pritchard died April 18, 2010, at Hilton Head Hospital, Hilton Head Island, South Carolina.
