= George Sweigert =

American inventor & scientist (1920–1999)

George Harry Sweigert
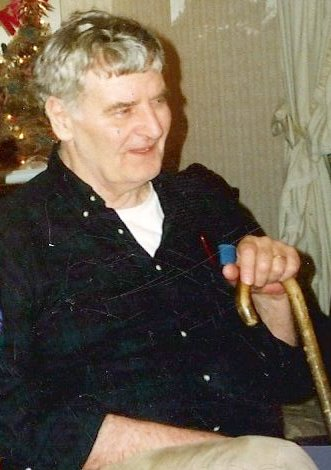
- Swigert in 1997
- Born: February 2, 1920; Akron, Ohio, United States
- Died: February 23, 1999 (aged 79); Fort Wayne, Indiana, United States
- Education: Bowling Green State University, Ohio
- Occupations: Inventor, Scientist
- Military career
- Allegiance: United States
- Branch: United States Army
- Unit: 37th Infantry Division
- Conflicts: World War II; Guadalcanal campaign; Bougainville Campaign

George H. Sweigert (1920–1999) is credited as the first inventor to patent the cordless telephone.

Born in Akron, Ohio, Sweigert served five years in the US Army as a radio operator in World War II in Guadalcanal, Bougainville, Fiji and New Georgia assigned to the 145th Headquarters Company under the 37th Infantry Division (United States). Following the war, Sweigert attended Bowling Green State University near Toledo, Ohio.

Sweigert credited his military experience for invention of the cordless telephone, citing experimentation with various antennas, signal frequencies, and types of radios.

== Radio telephone ==
With the patent application submitted on May 2, 1966 to the US Patent and Trademark Office, Sweigert submitted a working model of the phone in addition to the required description. A Cleveland Plain Dealer article, published shortly after the patent was filed, documented the first public demonstration of the cordless phone with a picture of the device and the inventor.

The Plain Dealer reported that Sweigert used a part from his washing machine for the invention - the solenoid used to lift the phone's receiver when a current was sensed in the induction coil. Sweigert, who suffered severe back pain from a war injury, saw the device primarily helping handicapped and elderly people.

The US Patent and Trademark Office issued U.S. patent 3,449,750 on June 10, 1969. The New York Times reported the patent in the June 14th, 1969 edition. (page 52, column 6) In the article, Sweigert gives the first description of how the "remote phone" might be used as a remote office or around the home, foreshadowing the way cell phones are used today.

Sweigert held two amateur radio licenses: W8ZIS (Ohio) and N9LC (Indiana). He held the amateur radio extra class license, the highest class license. He also held a First Class Radiotelephone license issued by the Federal Communications Commission.

== Role models ==
Sweigert's heroes included Samuel Morse, Thomas Edison, Alexander Graham Bell, Lee DeForest, Edwin Armstrong, Albert Einstein, and Philo Taylor Farnsworth. Sweigert was coincidentally born in the same city that hosts the National Inventors Hall of Fame, Akron, Ohio.

Sweigert studied the life stories of these inventors, and he frequently would recount the early technical and legal struggles of these inventors to get their inventions patented and protected.

Edison's early technical struggles with full duplex (two way) communication was another favorite subject, born out of Edison's desire to "speed up" telegraphic conversations by sending and receiving at the same time. Whether Edison could actually perform this telegraphic feat has never documented, but Sweigert credited this story with his inspiration for a full duplex cordless telephone. Sweigert studied how duplexes reduced frustrations dealing with technologies, going back to the early days of telegraphy.

Sweigert admired Alexander Graham Bell's work with the deaf as an inspiration for development of the telephone. One of Sweigert's sons is hearing impaired. This may explain Sweigert's intricate use of amplifiers in the initial invention. Sweigert was physically disabled, and saw the cordless phone as a similar to the telephone in terms of motivation and inspiration for the development of the invention. Sweigert sided with Alexander Graham Bell in the Elisha Gray and Alexander Bell telephone controversy, although Elisha Gray was another Cleveland inventor. He did credit Gray with being the first to come up with a way of multiplexing several messages simultaneously on the same wire.

He also enjoyed the fact that Bell was a complete amateur compared with professional established laboratories of Elisha Gray and super-inventor Thomas Edison. He greatly admired Edison's work on improving the vibrating diaphragm to vary the induced resistance from varying frequency in the voice. He frequently cited Bell besting Edison on the invention of the telephone as Edison's motivation to invent the phonograph. He expressed dismay how Bell missed inventing the phonograph after his frequent lectures about visualizing audio waves and electrically reproducing them. Sweigert credited being able to visualize human voice waveforms as another key in perfecting the cordless phone.

Sweigert also admired Edwin Armstrong and his invention of FM radio. Armstrong's concept of the superheterodyne receiver to filter out noise and amplify the original signal is used in the cordless phone. He also admired Armstrong's courage to challenge the status quo of AM radio and its powerful leader, David Sarnoff.

== Wireless networking ==
Sweigert's eureka moment for the cordless phone was similar, imagining the human voice waveform for a word as a short "wavelet" traveling through the air and then the wire, linking the words together to reproduce a conversation. He envisioned a home where all kinds of devices generated "message wavelets" to share the electromagnetic spectrum, foreshadowing Ethernet. Sweigert's philosophy was "the simpler, the better, as could be understood by a child". He often recounted Albert Einstein's experience of reading a children's story about a child racing a telegraph signal going through a wire.

His later years were spent trying to perfect antenna designs, applying the work of James Clerk Maxwell's work on electromagnetic theory and Maxwell's Equations. His persistent frustration after the invention of the cordless phone was his inability to do the advanced calculus required by the equations for advanced antenna design.

Sweigert predicted that half of the people in the world would own a wireless phone in the time of his children. With the world population of wireless phones at 3.2 billion in 2008, he was probably not far wrong with this prediction. He predicted integrated cameras, GPS, accelerometers, and other advanced sensors in the 1969 Moon lander would be integrated into the wireless phone. Sweigert received notice of his patent approval on day of the first Moon landing on June 20, 1969.

== Later years ==
Sweigert greatly admired Philo Farnsworth for his invention of television, and more specifically his work with the cathode ray tube and the electronic amplifier. Sweigert nicknamed his oscilloscope in his home electronics lab "Philo" in honor of Philo Farnsworth, critical to Sweigert for visualizing his "word worms". He also admired Farnsworth for his ability to challenge RCA, founding the Farnsworth Television and Radio Corporation in Fort Wayne, Indiana in 1938. While reading about Farnsworth and his later work on submarine detection equipment, he was led to a research and development position with Magnavox Corporation in Fort Wayne, Indiana in 1969.

Sweigert took the R&D position with Magnavox Corporation in 1969 in Fort Wayne to work on Army field radios for soldiers in the Vietnam War. He sympathized with the soldiers fighting in the Vietnam jungles which were similar to the jungle conditions he fought in at Guadalcanal and Bougainville Island in the Second World War. Magnavox field radios were key to the US Army for the entire Vietnam War. Sweigert was fascinated by the development of the integrated circuit and its potential uses to reduce the size of electronic products. He was friends with many of the people involved in the founding of Bowmar Instrument Corporation in Fort Wayne, the makers of the first electronic pocket calculator, or more popularly known as the Bowmar Brain.

Sweigert taught electronics at the vocational college level in his later years for ITT Technical Institute in Fort Wayne despite his physical disability. He credited ITT for purchasing the Farnsworth Television from Philo Farnsworth, enabling him to finally receive compensation for his invention. Sweigert sympathized with the struggles in the later life of Edwin Armstrong and wanted to avoid a similar fate in his own life.

== Trivia ==
Sweigert also admired Guglielmo Marconi for his work with wireless telegraphy. He was internally conflicted on whether Nikola Tesla or Marconi should be credited with the invention of radio.

== See also ==
- Telecommunications
- Radio
- History of radio
- Cordless telephone
