= Petru Bogdan =

Romanian chemist, educator, and politician

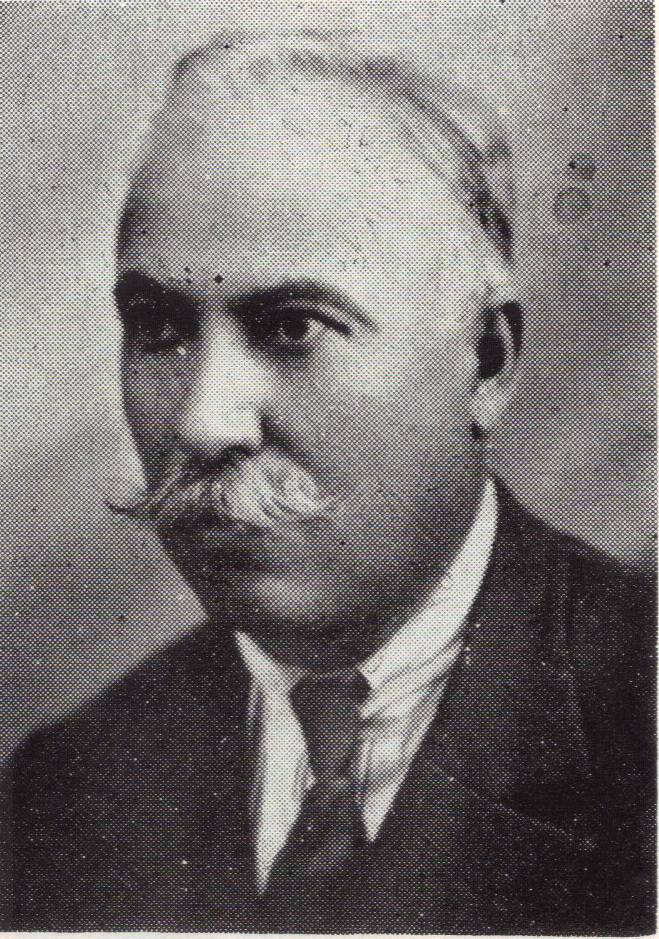
- Born: 2 February 1873; Cozmești, Iași County, Romania
- Died: 28 March 1944 (aged 71); Mediaș, Sibiu County, Kingdom of Romania
- Education: University of Iași; University of Berlin
- Scientific career
- Fields: Chemistry
- Workplaces: University of Iași; Romanian Academy
- Doctoral students: Theodor V. Ionescu

Petru Bogdan (29 January 1873 – 28 March 1944) was a Romanian chemist, educator, and politician. In 1926, he was elected a titular member of the Romanian Academy.

He was born in Cozmești, Iași County, the son of Vasile Bogdan (the mayor of the village) and Ana, née Timuș; his father died four years later, during the Romanian War of Independence of 1877.

Bogdan was a professor at the University of Iași. He wrote the first treatise on physical chemistry in the Romanian language. In 1923, one of his students, Theodor V. Ionescu, who worked in plasma physics, was the first to defend a PhD thesis in physics at the University of Iași.

Bogdan was a member of the National Peasants' Party. He served as Mayor of Iași from January 1930 to March 1934.

He had 7 children, Margareta, Gheorghe, Maria, Elena, Ana, Constantin, and Ioan; one of his grandsons was Ioan Petru Culianu.

== Publications ==
Studiul Chimiei Fisicale (4 volumes)

- ITeoria cinetică,
- IITermodinamica,
- IIIElectrochimia,
- IVStructura atomului. Radioactivitatea.
