= WASSAIL =

WASSAIL is an open-source software platform for educational assessment, designed primarily for academic libraries. It is used to “systematically track, store and analyze assessment data to measure and improve student learning.” Since its inception in 2003 the software has been adopted by dozens of academic libraries, including those at the Miami University, the University of Kansas, Red Deer College, and Northern Alberta Institute of Technology. The name is an acronym for “Web-based Augustana Student Survey Assessment of Information Literacy,” reflecting its origins and ongoing development at the Augustana Faculty of the University of Alberta.

WASSAIL 3.0 is a database-driven, web-based application employing PHP, MySQL, JavaScript and AJAX. WASSAIL facilitates the development and storage of question banks; the generation of online (or paper) surveys and tests from those question banks; and the accumulation and storage of question responses. Its most powerful feature is the ability to create and generate reports. These reports typically measure the impact of information literacy instruction on student learning and on specific demographics (discipline, year, gender, etc.).

== Recognition ==
WASSAIL's developers were awarded the 2010 Instruction Section Innovation Award from the Association of College and Research Libraries.
