= Izvoare, Dolj =

Izvoare
- Commune
- Location in Romania
- Coordinates: 44°9′N 23°18′E
- Country: Romania
- County: Dolj
- Area: 49.12 km^{2} (18.97 sq mi)
- Population (2021-12-01): 1,321
  - Density: 26.89/km^{2} (69.65/sq mi)
- Time zone: UTC+02:00 (EET)
  - Summer (DST): UTC+03:00 (EEST)
- Vehicle reg.: DJ

Izvoare is a commune in Dolj County, Oltenia, Romania with a population of 2,103 people. It is composed of three villages: Corlate, Domnu Tudor and Izvoare.

== Natives ==
- Lelia Constantza Băjenescu (1908 ― 1980), first female amateur radio operator in Romania
