= Lelia Constantza Băjenescu =

Lelia Constanța Băjenescu
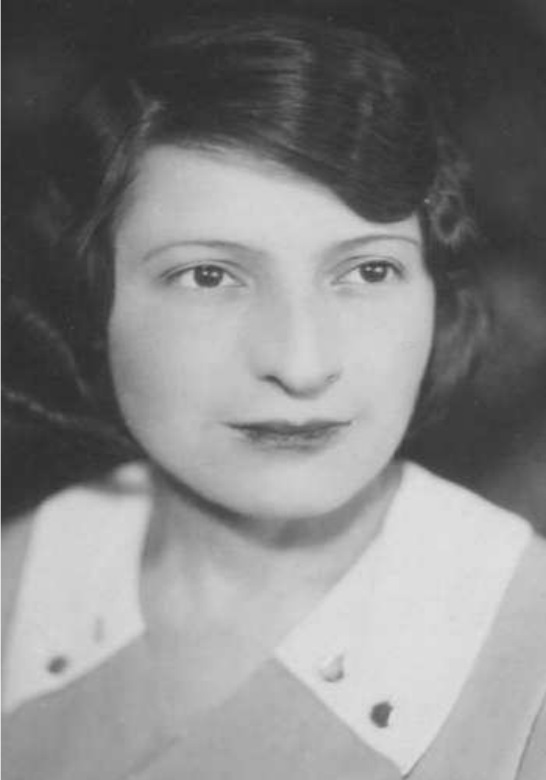
- Lelia Constanța Băjenescu (1933)
- Born: May 21, 1908; Corlate, Kingdom of Romania
- Died: December 15, 1980 (aged 72); Craiova, Socialist Republic of Romania
- Known for: First female amateur radio operator in Romania
- Spouse: Ioan Titu Băjenescu (m. 1929)
- Children: Titu-Marius
- Call sign: YLCV5BI

Lelia Constanța Băjenescu (/ˌbəʒɛnɛskʊ/; 21 May 1908 in Corlate, Dolj, Kingdom of Romania – 15 December 1980 in Craiova, Dolj, Socialist Republic of Romania) was the first female amateur radio operator in Romania.

== Biography ==
Born on May 21, 1908, in Corlate (Oltenia, Romania), daughter of Gheorghe and Smaranda Petrescu. In 1926 she passed her bacalaureat at the "Elena Cuza" high school in Craiova.

In 1929 she married Telecommunication officer Ioan Titu Băjenescu. He, being quite interested by radio technology, produced, in collaboration with dr. Alexandru Savopol of Craiova, the first Romanian amateur radio show on short waves on September 26, 1926. Together, they built the first short-wave transmission-reception radio station in Romania and laid the foundations of the CV5 radio club of Craiova in 1928.

Lelia Băjenescu was intrigued by her husband's radio activities. With her solid education, ability able to speak German and French fluently, and well rounded culture, she quickly joined him. She learned the radio essentials and Morse alphabet by participating in the construction and commissioning of radio transmitter-receivers and mastered all of the key aspects of amateur radio. Soon she became the first female amateur radio operator of Romania, using her husband's call-sign, CV5BI. She contacted other radio amateurs from all over Europe and even Africa from 1931 to 1933.

She gave birth to Titu-Marius on the 2nd of April, 1933. He would later speak about his parents in an interview and an extended CV as the intro to his life's story.
