= Wacław Łukaszewicz =

- Born: August 24, 1927; Mońki, Poland
- Died: April 16, 2014 (aged 86); Warsaw, Poland
- Occupation: Scout leader (since 1976)

Wacław Łukaszewicz (Polish pronunciation: [ˈvat͡swaf wukaˈʂɛvit͡ʂ]; 24 August 1927 – 16 April 2014) was a scout leader of ZHP, scoutmaster, expert of radiocommunication, and promoter of radiocommunication in Polish scouting.

== Biography ==
During Nazi occupation in age of 15 he was involved in several sabotages in Railway near to Vilnius and took participation in Home Army operations. After intervening Soviet Army onto Lithuanian Wacław Łukaszewicz was incorporated into Red Army as a sapper, whence however having been a railwayman became shortly dismissed. After liberation of the Republic of Poland he drove (as a repatriant) to Rzepin onto Recovered Territories, where he restarted jobbing for Polish Railway.

In 1946 he joined to ZHP - into Bolesław I Chrobry's Scout Troop in Sulęcin. In 1976 he took Scout Leader commitment.

In 1955 he was a member of Polish Mission in Neutral Countries Supervision Commission in Korea. Since 1956 until 1970 he was working in the Main Management of Polish Aero Club as Senior inspector of Radiocommunication in Amateur Sport Aviation. Until recently: a member of Government Examination Commission of Air Radiocommunication and a member of Government Examination Commission of Radioamateur Movement in Electronic Communication Office.

In 1971 he was co-initiator of Special Event Radio Station SQ5Z (Polish – „ZAMEK”, English – „CASTLE”). The aim of the station was to popularize the project of rebuilding of Royal Castle in Warsaw. For 20 years he was being a secretary of Warsaw Voivodeship Management of Polish Amateur Radio Union and being a member of Government Examination Commission of Radioamateur Movement for Operator's Certificates.

Since 1979 until 1999 he was the Manager of Radiocommunication and Amateur Radiolocation Inspectorate of Capital Banner of ZHP. Also the vice-chef of Radiocommunication in Bieszczady 40 Operation Staff in 1977 and the chef of Radiocommunication in 1978, co-organizer of backstage-defensive manoeuvrings (e. g. VI and XI Central Backstage-Defensive Manoeuvrings of ZHP and also banner manoeuvrings) and co-organizer of shortwave contests, including Contests called Służbowa Łączność Radiowa (en. Official Radiocommunication). Organizer of Radioamateur Shortwave clubs in detachments of Capital Banner like Scouts Amateur Club Station SP5ZIP, Commandant of Capital Banner's training capms. He carried out numerous Radiocommunication trainings and supported Phone-communication. First category referee in Amateur radio direction finding of Polish Assosiacion of Amateur radio direction finding, multiple referee of General Polish Championships of Amateur radio direction finding and Contests of Mermaid Cup (pol. Puchar Syreny). He carried out trainings and Contests for Scouts environments of Capital Banner, he was in charge of Radiocommunication during general events of Capital Banner – including White Service in 1999 on Piłsudski Square during Pope John Paul's II Pilgrimage to Poland. Since 1985 until 1989 a member of Capital Banner's Council.

He worked in Special Educational Center in Warsaw near to New Town Market Place 4. Co-organizer of Traffic Safety tournaments for children and non-union youth.

== Orders and distinctions ==
- Order of Polonia Restituta (1987)
- Gold Cross of Merit (1988)
- Silver Cross of Merit (1969)
- Medal of Merit for National Defence (1987)
- Honourable Shield of Polish Scouts Friends Movement (1970)
- Shield of Merit for Sport Aviation Activist (1972)
- Gold Shield "Merited Radiocommunication Worker" (1975)
- Shield "Merited for Bieszczady" (1977)
- Gold Shield of "Merit for Warszaw" (1982)
- Silver Shield of „Merit for Civil Defence” (1987)
- Memorial Shield "In Acknowledgement for Merite in Co-operating with Polish Air Force Academy in Dęblin" (1990)
- Gold Cross of "Merit for ZHP" (1999)
- Honourable Shield of Polish Amateur Radio Union (2005)

== Bibliography ==
- .
- .
