= Harold Dorschug =

American radio engineer

Harold A. Dorschug (March 29, 1913 – September 13, 1999) was one of the master control engineers during The Mercury Theatre on the Air broadcast of H. G. Wells' The War of the Worlds on CBS radio in October 1938. Later, he moved to West Hartford, CT and was Chief Engineer and Director of Research and Development of WTIC radio and Channel 3 television in Hartford, Connecticut for many years. He was a very generous gentleman and helped put many of the Hartford area educational stations on the air on a pro bono basis, including WQTQ at Weaver High School and WWUH at the University of Hartford. In 1975 he built and licensed WJMJ, the station in Bloomfield, CT licensed to St. Thomas Seminary. Dorschug died September 13, 1999.

He was an amateur radio operator starting at age 16, and then studied electrical engineering at Syracuse University. He served in the U.S. Navy in World War II. After the war, he was chief engineer at WEEI in Boston and taught radio and television courses at Boston University.

== Bibliography ==
- The Good Old Days of Radio Broadcast Engineering (1971)

== Trivia ==
His amateur radio call signs were W1AST and W8AST
