= Pertti Kärkkäinen =

Finnish diplomat (1933–2017)

Pertti Ahti Olavi Kärkkäinen
- Born: April 3, 1933; Viipuri, Finland
- Died: January 10, 2017 (aged 83); Helsinki, Finland
- Education: Bachelor of Political Science
- Occupation: Diplomat
- Known for: Finnish Ambassador to Indonesia, Malaysia, Argentina, Chile, Peru

Pertti Ahti Olavi Kärkkäinen (3 April 1933 – 10 January 2017) was a Finnish diplomat. He was born in Viipuri and held a Bachelor of Political Science degree. He served as Finnish Ambassador to Jakarta (Indonesia) from 1982 to 1985, and to Kuala Lumpur (Malaysia) 1983–1985 and to Buenos Aires (Argentina) from 1988 to 1993, and to Santiago (Chile) from 1988 to 1991 and to Lima (Peru) from 1991 to 1993.

Pertti Kärkkäinen was also an active radio amateur from 1952. His calling signs were OH2MT and OH3GQ. He died, aged 83, in Helsinki.
