= Dean Spratt =

American traffic reporter

Dean Spratt (1952–2007) was an American traffic reporter. He was one of eight children born to Mary and Ray Spratt. He grew up in Minneapolis, Minnesota. Blind from birth Spratt attended St. Cloud State University where he studied communications. In November 1981, Spratt became the first traffic reporter at WCCO-AM radio, as well as the first blind traffic reporter in the country. Spratt worked primarily out of an office in his home that he transformed into a sound booth and filled it with police scanners, telephones, radio equipment, and later computers.

== Life ==
Spratt was married to Stephanie Borden and they had a son, Benjamin. They divorced in 1987. Spratt later married Carolyn who brought three sons to the family and together they had two daughters, Elizabeth and Lisa.

Spratt was a lover of electronics and amateur radio. He held the callsign N0HSR from 1997 until his death in 2007. On satellite communication networks he was known as the SkyScanner.

In 2004 Dean lost his position at WCCO due to consolidation and restructuring. His traffic position was outsourced to a company called Metro, who hired Spratt to continue to do the traffic. But, that position was also phased out. He then took up his hobby of amateur radio, and joined the W0KIE Satellite Radio Network where he hosted a weekly music/tech/comedy show, Thursday Night Potpourri. It was broadcast on W0KIE as well as streamed on the internet.

== Death ==
In January 2007 Spratt suffered a stroke. Shortly before entering physical therapy Spratt developed a complication and died on January 20, 2007, surrounded by family.

== Legacy ==
Shortly after Spratt's death, W0KIE disappeared from the airwaves; but a successor emerged under the new moniker SkyScanner Satellite Radio Network, in Spratt's honor, and remained on air until moving exclusively to the internet in 2011. The network still replays Spratt's Thursday Night Potpourri show.

The radio serial, Powder River, produced by the Colonial Radio Theatre, and a favorite satellite program, dedicated its fourth season to Spratt, who guest starred in two episodes as Dr. Lyman before he died.
