= Alvin Devane =

American singer and police lieutenant

Alvin DeVane
- Born: November 2, 1923; Elba, Alabama
- Died: January 1, 2012 (aged 88)
- Resting place: Oakwood Cemetery, Austin, Texas
- Known for: 26 years with the Austin Police Department and namesake of Alvin DeVane Boulevard
- Spouse(s): Antoinette ("Toni"; m. September 1944, d. November 2011)
- Children: 4
- Call sign: WB5HZQ

Alvin Earl DeVane (November 2, 1923 – January 1, 2012) was a former Army Air Forces sergeant and a retired Austin Police lieutenant. A street in Austin, Texas is named for him, since its opening in 1984. He was an amateur radio operator, and an active member and former president of Austin's barbershop singing community.

== Early life ==
DeVane was born in Elba, Alabama in 1923 and enlisted in the Army Air Corps (then recently a component of the United States Army Air Forces) in 1943, during which he was a C-47 radio operator in the Pacific Theatre. A sergeant, he was assigned to the 318th Troop Carrier Squadron (Commando), 3rd Air Commando Group.

== Career and recognition ==
DeVane was a member of the Austin Police Department from 1957 to 1983. A lot of his time there was spent as a street cop, but he later achieved the rank of Lieutenant and served in the traffic office. The American-Statesman pictured DeVane in uniform among others at a disaster center for a May 1981 flood in Austin.

When DeVane was nearing retirement, one of his daughters sought to have a street named for him as a retirement gift. She started by writing a letter to a popular Q&A columnist in the Austin American-Statesman, Ellie Rucker. She then investigated the possibility of changing the name of the street he lived on, but soon found that to be entirely too cumbersome a project. She moved on to finding a developer who would name a new street after him instead. She contacted an acquaintance of his in the city's Street and Bridge department who was instrumental in making it happen. A new development was being planned for southeast Austin, that would be the site of Advanced Micro Devices. Thanks to the generosity of a developer, her dream became a reality in December 1984. Street and Bridge made a street sign for her to present to him along with the city plat, detailing the location. The event was covered by a local news television station and was also picked up by the AP, appearing in the Dallas paper.

== Personal life ==
During his military service, DeVane was stationed at Austin's Bergstrom Field where he met his future wife, Antoinette "Toni", at a USO dance. Married in September 1944, they had four children and seven grandchildren. DeVane has a namesake, Alvin DeVane II, who resides in Dallas.

He was a fan of local Texas Longhorns sports, as well as their marching band, particularly during its DiNino era of directorship.

DeVane was a member of The Chordrangers barbershop chorus and former president of Austin's chapter of SPEBSQSA, the Barbershop Harmony Society. He was also an amateur radio operator, having used the callsign WB5HZQ.
