= Joe Barr =

American journalist (1944–2008)

- Born: October 19, 1944
- Died: July 11, 2008 (aged 63)
- Occupation: Technology journalist

Joe Barr (October 19, 1944 – July 11, 2008) was an American technology journalist, an editor and writer for the SourceForge sites Linux.com and IT Manager's Journal.

A former programmer, Barr had worked on everything from microcomputers, and writing code in more than a dozen languages, much of that experience coming in his 13 years with Ross Perot's EDS.

Barr began writing about personal computing in 1994, and primarily about Linux and open source in 1998, when he began writing for IDG's LinuxWorld.com. The MPlayer project made him even better known by dedicating a derogatory page to him in their documentation after he wrote a piece entitled MPlayer: The project from hell.

In 2001, Barr was awarded a Silver Medal by the American Society of Business Publication Editors in the category of Original Web Commentary for his LinuxWorld.com article entitled Dumbing Down Linux. In his last years he worked at OSTG, writing articles, columns, and commentary for NewsForge and Linux.com. Barr's first book, CLI for Noobies, was published in 2007 by the SourceForge Community Press.

He also was an enthusiastic amateur radio operator using his callsign W5CT.

Barr died on July 11, 2008.
