= Ulrich L. Rohde =

German-American engineering scientist and entrepreneur

- Born: May 20, 1940 (age 85); Munich, Germany
- Education: Technical University of Munich, Technische Universität Berlin
- Occupation: Electrical engineer
- Known for: Development of modern microwave technologies

Ulrich Lothar Albert Rohde (born May 20, 1940, in Munich) is a German and American electrical engineer, entrepreneur, and university professor.

== Education and career ==
After receiving his Abitur in Munich, Rohde studied electrical engineering at the Technische Hochschule München and the Technische Hochschule Darmstadt. In 1978, he received a doctorate in radio-frequency engineering and joined the Epsilon Sigma chapter of the Eta Kappa Nu society; he then completed an executive business administration programme at Columbia University in 1980. He received his Dr.-Ing. degree (doctorate in engineering) from Technische Universität Berlin in 2004, and his habilitation from the Brandenburg University of Technology in 2011.

Since 1973, Rohde has been a partner of Rohde & Schwarz in Munich, his father's company. From 1974 to 1982, he headed the US branch of Rohde & Schwarz; after that, he was managing director of an RCA defence subsidiary.

In 1977, Rohde was appointed as a professor at the University of Florida, and in 1982 at the George Washington University as an adjunct professor, of electrical engineering.

Rohde's professional interests include computer-aided design of microwave components, low-noise microwave oscillators and amplifiers as well as active antennas and state of the art HF/UHF systems. In these fields, he founded several companies and holds about 50 patents.

== Awards ==
Rohde has been granted honorary doctorates by the Romanian universities of Oradea and Cluj-Napoca in 1997. In 2002, Rohde has been chosen as a fellow of the Institute of Electrical and Electronics Engineers (IEEE) for "contributions to and leadership in the development and industrial implementation of microwave computer-aided design technology." He was appointed honorary senator by the University of the Bundeswehr Munich in 2008 and by the Brandenburg University of Technology in 2011. In 2021, he was awarded the Cross of Merit of the Federal Republic of Germany.

In 2023, he received the IEEE Distinguished Industry Leader Award "for the scientific contribution and leadership to the field of antennas and related communication systems, leading to development of state-of-the-art antenna products for industrial, military and aerospace applications."

On Sept. 11, 2023, the Radio Club of America said that Rohde would be honored by the club with the inauguration of a new award in 2023: “Dr. Ulrich L. Rohde Award for Innovation in Applied Radio Science and Engineering.” The club said that the award recognizes Rohde's significant contributions to innovation in the wireless industry and that it would inspire future generations of wireless professionals. The first recipient of the new award will be named in 2024, the club said.

In January 2024, Dr. Ulrich L. Rohde was appointed “Fellow of Industry Academy” in the “International Artificial Intelligence Industry Alliance” based in Hong Kong.

In April 2025, Ulrich L. Rohde was appointed as a Visiting Scientist at the Microsystems Technology Laboratories at the Massachusetts Institute of Technology.

In June 2025, he has been awarded the Bavarian Order of Merit. The award is considered a “sign of grateful recognition for outstanding achievements and services to the Free State of Bavaria and the Bavarian people.”

In January 2026, he received the Lifetime Achievement Award of the Broadcast Engineering Society (India) and was named an honorary member.

== Lectures ==
- "A complete practical and mathematical treatment of Microwave LC Based 0scillators using Bipolar, MESFETs and CMOS Transistors", Lincoln Laboratory, Massachusetts Institute of Technology, Oct 8, 2024.
- "Global Markets, Global Technology and Global Students", Bavarian Academy of Sciences and Humanities, Jul 23, 2025.
- "Noise in Oscillators with Active Inductors", MTL Special Seminar, Massachusetts Institute of Technology, Oct 7, 2025.
