= Karl Rothammel =

Karl Rothammel (1914 – 1987) was an amateur radio enthusiast, author and educator. He published articles in the journal Radioamatér for five years, and authored several books including Very High Frequencies and Practice of the Television Aerials. Rothammel was born in 1914 in Fürth, Bavaria; he died at the age of 73 in Sonneberg, Thuringia (then part of East Germany). Y21BK was his last amateur call sign.
