= Laurie Margolis =

British journalist (born 1950)

Laurie Margolis (born 1950) is a BBC journalist and news editor.

== Career ==
On 2 April 1982 Margolis obtained information about the Argentinian invasion of the Falkland Islands using amateur radio and broke the news in the UK on BBC Radio 4 PM at 17:00 (BST).

Margolis (callsign G3UML) used a short-wave radio transceiver, connected to a large aerial on the roof of the Langham Hotel in London, to establish radio contact with Bob McLeod (callsign VP8LP) in the Falklands Islands. The transcontinental SSB radio communication was made at 16:00 (BST) on 21.205 MHz from the BBC's amateur radio club which was located in attic room 701 the hotel. Margolis recorded the conversation on an audio cassette.

On 28 December 2012, following the release of government files about the Falklands War by The National Archives in London, under a 30-year rule, BBC TV broadcast this story again.

Margolis's retirement from the BBC, on 22 August 2024, was announced the day before, on the Radio 4 PM programme.
