= Tsuneyoshi Yamano =

Japanese radio operator

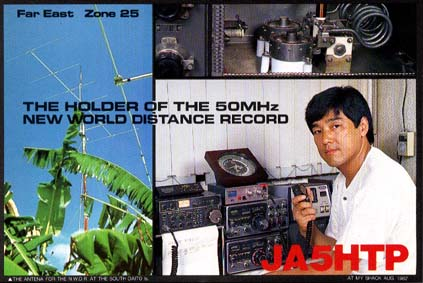
- Born: Tsuneyoshi Yamano; December 12, 1946 (age 79); Tokushima, Japan
- Occupations: Computer engineer and Manager

Tsuneyoshi Yamano (山野 常禎, Yamano Tsuneyoshi; born December 12, 1946 in Tokushima, Japan) is an amateur radio operator, call sign is JA5HTP, who set distance records and has contributed to the development of amateur radio.

== Career ==
He attended Konan University, Department of Literature at the age of 18. Graduating in 1968, he moved to Minami-daito Island to establish the longest radio traffic record in the world. Then he successfully made the radio contact with PY5BAB from Curitiba where 19997.05 km away from Minami-daito Island is. As a result, he had become the new world record holder of the 50 MHz and it was pressed in the 1984 Guinness Book.

Afterward, he contributed much to the amateur radio’s developments. He served as a councilor of Japan Amateur Radio League Tokushima Prefecture for six terms, the Chair of DCCS, the committee member on the investigation study of the digitalization technology for amateur radio and the Chair of Japanese Red Cross Society Tokushima Chapter, Special Volunteers consists of Radio communication from 2008.

Japan Amateur Radio League applied the patent 'Network system, wireless terminal equipment, and wireless relay device' as study results, and he was announced as the joint inventor.

Furthermore, he has also been interested in the next generation computer network and gave a conference seminar "Local revitalization which uses AIR Mac in the shopping district" on Macworld Tokyo 2002 as a lecturer.

Lately, he is taking part in founding the Institute for Satellite Communication in Republic of Vanuatu, using the Wideband Internetworking engineering test and Demonstration Satellite "KIZUNA” (WINDS) as a part of the project of Japan Aerospace Exploration Agency (JAXA).

== Reference literature ==
- Norris McWhirter. Guinness Book of World Records 1984. ISBN 978-0-553-23990-4
