= Lester Picker =

Lester Picker (September 26, 1905 – May 10, 1930) was an American amateur radio operator famous in the early 1920s. Picker achieved fame when he fell 55 ft (17 m) when erecting an aerial for his radio. He broke his neck as a result of the fall and was paralyzed. Picker, who operated under the call signs of 6AJH and 6ZH and lived in San Diego, California, was also the District Superintendent for the American Radio Relay League.

Prior to his fall, Picker was slated to graduate high school. By the use of his radio he was able to graduate from Roosevelt Memorial High School in San Diego.
