= Wasil Ahmad =

Afghan child soldier

Wasil Ahmad واصل احمد
- Born: c. 2005; Urozgan Province, Afghanistan
- Died: February 2016 (aged 11); Kandahar, Afghanistan
- Employer: Afghan Government

Wasil Ahmad (c. 2005 – February 2016) was an Afghan child soldier, best known for commanding a police unit and his subsequent killing by the Taliban when he was eleven years old. His uncle Samad, trained him "in the use of AK-47 and PK machine guns, rockets and mortars as well as satellite phones and VHF radios." He took command of his uncle Samad's police unit, after Samad was injured in 2015. He was murdered on February 1, 2016, by two masked gunmen.

== Upbringing ==
Wasil Ahmad was born in Uruzgan province. The region has been described as "long... a centre of conflict;" Taliban leader Mullah Mohammad Omar was born there, and the later president of Afghanistan, Hamid Karzai, led the first Pashtun revolt against the Taliban there in 2001. Ahmad's father had previously been killed fighting the Taliban, and his son later said that seeking revenge for his father's death was his main motivation in going to war. Ahmad's uncle was the Afghan Local Police commander in Khas Uruzgan District, Uruzgan province. He had previously been a Taliban commander, but had changed sides in 2012, and was now fighting for the Afghan government. In summer 2015, Khas Uruzgan- his area of control- was besieged by the Taliban, and Samad was injured. Ahmad subsequently took command of his uncle's unit.

== Siege ==
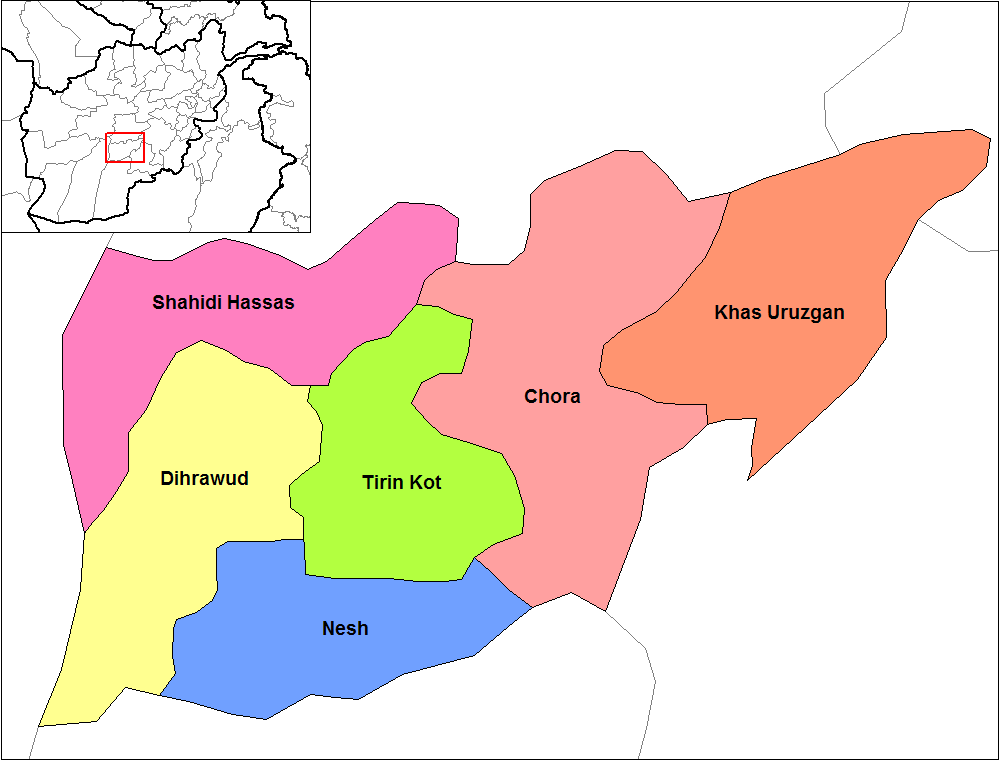
Oruzgan districts

At the height of the Dan Sango siege, Ahmad was commanding 75 pro-government soldiers against an attacking force of approximately "hundreds" of Taliban. The siege itself lasted for 71 days, and Ahmad commanded his squad for 43 of them. He fired both mortars and rockets as well as machine guns from the compound roof. As well as physical fighting, Ahmad was also responsible for communications with the outside world, and the point of contact for the Afghan special forces. When the latter raised the siege in August 2015, Ahmad and 35 surviving soldiers were airlifted out by Afghan and NATO helicopters to Tarin Kowt. According to Samad, the authorities "praised him and his nephew Wasil as heroes."

== Murder ==
Following the siege, Ahmad enrolled into school in the fourth-grade, whilst also receiving private tuition at home. He improved his English, although was not "a good student" – possibly, a neighbor later commented, because he had been "highly encouraged by police officials and awarded medals for his bravery" and only "wanted to play with weapons and drive police vehicles as a hobby." He was authorized to carry a pistol to school. On Monday, 1 February 2016, at the local bazaar, on his way to school, he was shot twice in the head by masked gunmen on a motorbike drive-by shooting, in what has been called a "targeted assassination". He later died in a Kandahar hospital and was buried in the local Shahidano cemetery.

== Controversy ==
Following Ahmad's death, there was controversy as to his precise position in the besieged force. Samad stressed that Ahmad was merely "defending his family," whilst Samad recovered from injuries he had already received. The Afghanistan Independent Human Rights Commission, however, said that, since he had been supplied with a gun and a police uniform, this was in breach of anti-child-soldiering laws. The commission also suggested that the police had themselves endangered Ahmad's life by lauding him as a hero. They had garlanded him 'with plastic flowers' and even held a program at Police headquarters "where his bravery and courage were talked about by officials." The government Ministry of Interior Affairs also denied that child soldiers were used by government forces. Conversely, the charity Child Soldiers International has also claimed that both sides used them.
