= Wireless Institute Civil Emergency Network =

Australian Emergency Radio Organisation

WICEN
- Wireless Institute Civil Emergency Network
- Location: Australia
- Services: Emergency Radio Communication
- Website: https://wicen.org.au/

The Wireless Institute Civil Emergency Network (WICEN) is a group of Australian emergency amateur radio organisations. WICEN groups provide communications during emergencies or disasters when normal communications stop working. WICEN groups have assisted during bushfires, floods and cyclones. WICEN groups also provide communications at events such as the Great Victorian Bike Ride, Red Cross Hawkesbury River Canoe Marathon and National Capital Rally. WICEN groups meet regularly to train and conduct exercises with other agencies.

WICEN members provide their own equipment and give up their own time to train, respond to emergencies and attend events.

== Organisation ==
While WICEN covers all of Australia, it is split into different groups which cover their own area or region. These groups are:

WICEN Groups
Group	Area Covered
WICEN ACT	Australian Capital Territory
WICEN NSW Inc	New South Wales
WICEN Victoria	Victoria
Brisbane Area WICEN Group	Queensland
WICEN South Australia	South Australia
WICEN Western Australia	Western Australia
WICEN Tasmania	Tasmania
WICEN Northern Territory	Northern Territory

== History ==
=== 1970s ===
WICEN responded to Cyclone Althea in 1971 and in Darwin in 1974 provided communications in and out of the city for two days after Cyclone Tracy. In 1975 WICEN appointed its first federal co-ordinator having only previously operated at a state level. In 1977 NSW WICEN provided communications during the Blue Mountains bushfires. The Winter 1978 edition of SITREP explained that NSW WICEN members would soon have identity cards, hard hats and vehicle identity stickers authorised by State Emergency Services and the NSW Police Department.

=== 1980s ===
On February 16, 1982, WICEN was asked to provide communications in Macclesfield, South Australia when network overload caused the telephones to stop working.

==== Ash Wednesday Bushfires ====
160 South Australian and Victorian WICEN members provided help to emergency services during the Ash Wednesday bushfires in 1983.

WICEN set up a control centre on a hill in a borrowed caravan. Positioned in a Melbourne suburb, the control centre used High frequency (HF) and Very High Frequency (VHF) links with rural areas. WICEN also used VHF repeaters belonging to the WIA. Some operators used mobile and hand-held radios while others volunteered from home stations. The Red Cross and St John's Ambulance Brigade relied on WICEN for communications. During the evacuations, Victorian Department of Community Welfare officers used WICEN. Backup communications were provided to both Macedon and Otways Country Fire Authority and individual police officers who did not have instant access to the police network used the WINCEN network as well.

The Department of Communications issued special callsigns to WICEN operators meaning callsigns didn't change as each operator changed shift.

Minister for Communications, Neil Brown said,

"The operators gave generously of their expertise and without thought of cost to themselves" "when communications were cut in the Gembrook and Emerald area, WINCEN operators remained there at risk to their own safety and reported on the progress of the fire, the availability of power, the supply of petrol for fire vehicles and other vital matters".

Some operators worked in or from homes in danger areas, and others returned from volunteering to discover their homes damaged.

=== 1980s ===
Help was also provided in 1985 when authorities responded to an avian influenza outbreak near Bendigo in Victoria. WICEN provided help at the 1986 Caltex Bike Ride in Victoria. In 1988 WICEN provided a shortwave communications network for the Castrol World Rally. Links were made between points during the rally and to the Headquarters in Canberra.

During the Newcastle Earthquake in 1989 WICEN provided assistance.

=== 1990s ===
WICEN provided support during the 1994 New South Wales fires, including in the search and rescue of about 50 Koalas together with the Oxley Region Amateur Radio Club (ORARC) for the Koala Preservation Society of Port Macquarie.

WICEN provided communications during the 1997 Thredbo landslide.

=== 2010s ===
New South Wales and Victoria WICEN members helped during the 2019—2020 "Black Summer" wildfires.

== Notable Members ==
- Brigadier R.K. Roseblade M.B.E, former Director of the Royal Australian Corps of Signals, was the first Federal co-ordinator of WICEN in 1975.
- Keith Roget (callsign VK3YQ) was a WICEN member and WIA Victoria president. After his death, the WIA National Parks Award was renamed to the Keith Roget Memorial National Parks Award.
- Peter Weeks (callsign VK3YZP) received the National Emergency Medal for his actions during the Black Saturday bushfires in 2009 and a Medal of the Order of Australia for his long time emergency service, including work for the State Emergency Service (SES).
- Fred Storey (callsign VK3JM) received the National Emergency Medal for his actions during the Black Saturday bushfires in 2009.
- Mark Dods (callsign) VK3ZR received the National Emergency Medal for his actions during the Black Saturday bushfires in 2009.
- John Brown (callsign VK3FR) received the National Emergency Medal for his actions during the Black Saturday bushfires in 2009.
- Richard Murnane (callsign VK2SKY) received the National Emergency Medal for his actions during the 2019-2020 "Black Summer" wildfires.

== See also ==
- Amateur Radio Emergency Service (ARES). A similar group in the United States.
- Amateur Radio Emergency Communications (AREC). A similar group in New Zealand.
- Radio Amateurs Emergency Network (RAYNET). A similar group in the United Kingdom.
