= War Emergency Radio Service =

Civil defense service in the United States from 1942 to 1945

The War Emergency Radio Service (WERS) was a civil defense service in the United States from 1942 to 1945. It was replaced by the current Radio Amateur Civil Emergency Service (RACES) system.

== History ==
When the United States entered the Second World War, the United States Congress had suspended all amateur radio activity throughout the country. WERS was established by the Federal Communications Commission in June 1942 at the insistence of the American Radio Relay League. WERS was to provide communications in connection with air raid protection, and communications during natural disasters. WERS licenses were given to communities, not to individuals; one of the requirements for individuals to participate in the WERS was to hold an Amateur radio license.

At the end of 1944, about five thousand radio transmitters operated under 250 licenses. WERS remained in operation through the end of the Second World War in 1945.

== Frequency bands ==
WERS was authorized to operate on the following bands.

Band name	Frequencies	Notes
2½ meters	112–116 MHz	Sixteen channels at 200 kHz spacing. Subset of current aircraft band
1¼ meters	219–225 MHz	Nearly identical to current 1.25 meter amateur band
70 cm band	400-401 MHz	Now allocated to Earth-orbiting satellite operations

Frequencies were required to be stable to within 0.1%; tighter frequency control would have required use of quartz crystals, which were in high demand at the time for military radio purposes. The intention of the service was for communications up to about 10 miles, so power was restricted to 25 watts. The Office of Civilian Defense recommended home-built equipment, using salvaged components from civilian receivers, so as not to require critical items not readily available during the war.

== See also ==
- Amateur Radio Emergency Service
- Amateur radio emergency communications
- Amateur radio operator
- Amateur radio station
