= International disaster response laws =

The growing number of disasters and their humanitarian impacts has prompted the need for a framework that addresses the responsibilities of states and humanitarian agencies in disaster settings. This has led to the emergence of international disaster response laws, rules and principless (IDRL): a collection of international instruments addressing various aspects of post-disaster humanitarian relief. The IDRL of the International Federation of Red Cross and Red Crescent (IFRC) examines the legal issues and frameworks associated with disaster response with particular emphasis on international humanitarian assistance. The IDRL Programme seeks to promote the use of the IDRL Guidelines and support national Red Cross societies in improving legal preparedness for natural disasters in order to reduce human vulnerability.

== Differing contexts – disasters and armed conflicts ==
There is often a greater expectation in the case of disasters than in armed conflicts that domestic authorities will take the primary role in international humanitarian aid efforts and will not only facilitate access, but also coordinate it and monitor its effectiveness. In addition, given the longer establishment of International Humanitarian Law (IHL), there is much broader acceptance and clarification of the specific rights and obligations in armed conflict. There are fewer conditions that can legitimately be imposed on international humanitarian organizations before allowing them access in conflict settings.

In terms of regulatory concerns, many of the same issues are faced in both disaster and conflict environments. These include regulatory barriers, such as bureaucratic delays in the entry of personnel, goods and equipment; and regulatory gaps, such as the absence of mechanisms to facilitate efficient domestic legal recognition of international organizations. There are also differences, however, for example concerns over security, which may not be as relevant in some disaster situations.

In mixed situations, where there is both a disaster and ongoing armed conflict – for example the 2004 tsunami in Sri Lanka – IHL is the governing law. Even if the need for relief is prompted by a natural disaster rather than by ongoing fighting, the obligations of the parties to the conflict in an armed conflict setting remain the same.

== The main sources of IDL ==
IDRL is not a comprehensive or unified framework. There are no core international treaties, such as the Geneva Conventions and Additional Protocols under IHL. Rather, it consists of a fragmented and piecemeal collection of various international, regional and bilateral treaties, non-binding resolutions, declarations, codes, guidelines, protocols and procedures. This includes relevant provisions of international treaties in other areas of law, such as international human rights law, international refugee law and IHL (in the case of conflict situations).

=== Treaties ===
These largely comprise bilateral treaties, covering various areas such as technical assistance, mutual assistance and agreements regulating humanitarian relief between the two state parties. The latter two tend to involve formal rules for the initiation and termination of assistance; and provisions for reducing regulatory barriers (involving e.g. visas and work permits and customs control for relief personal and goods). Regional treaties have largely been adopted for mutual disaster assistance and are in place in the Americas, Asia and Europe.

There are a limited number of multilateral treaties. Like other bilateral treaties, they are often focused on a particular sector of operations such as health, telecommunications and transport. The global, but sectoral, Tampere Convention of 1998, for example, commits parties to reduce regulatory barriers and restrictions on the use, import and export of telecommunications equipment for disaster relief. Some global treaties are specific to particular types of disasters, including environmental treaties and treaties concerning industrial or nuclear accidents. Although these global treaties are legally binding, many are limited in utility as few states have ratified them or they are very limited in scope, geographic reach, or enforceability. In addition, few treaties address international actors other than states or UN agencies.

=== International Custom ===
It has been argued that there is a right to receive humanitarian assistance in disaster situations under customary international law. Sources relied upon include the ‘Code of Conduct for the International Red Cross and Red Crescent Movement and NGOs in Disaster Relief’ which states that there is a right to receive and to offer humanitarian assistance. In addition, the right to a healthy environment as an aspect of the fundamental right to life has been relied upon not only to demonstrate a right to assistance under IHRL but also as part of customary international law.

However, for practice to develop into customary law there must be an indication of extensive and uniform state practice and a belief that such actions are required by law. In contrast, states have often responded to disasters on a case-by-case basis. It is also doubtful whether actions of non-state actors can be relied upon to satisfy the requirements of international custom.

=== UN resolutions (soft law) ===
The instruments with the broadest scope in IDRL are non-binding recommendations, declarations and guidelines. This includes the ‘Measures to Expedite International Relief’, endorsed by the UN General Assembly and the International Conference of the Red Cross in 1977. The General Assembly also passed Resolution 36/225 in 1981, which called for strengthening the UN’s capacity to respond to disasters; and Resolution 46/182 in 1992, which called for a ‘strengthening of the coordination of emergency humanitarian assistance of the United Nations system’. Around the same time, the office that would later become the Office for the Coordination of Humanitarian Affairs (OCHA) was created. In 2002, the General Assembly adopted Resolution 57/150, which reaffirmed resolution 46/182 and provided for strengthening the effectiveness and coordination of international urban search and rescue assistance.

=== IDRL Guidelines ===
The International Federation of Red Cross and Red Crescent Societies adopted in 2007 the ‘Guidelines for the Domestic Facilitation and Regulation of International Disaster Relief and Initial Recovery Assistance’. They are considered to be a significant development to the IDRL framework, with the potential to contribute to the development of norms under customary international law.

== The gaps in IDRL and related problems ==
While regulatory problems in the delivery of humanitarian assistance exist in both disaster and conflict settings, they are exacerbated in the former due to the absence of an established comprehensive legal framework and an undeveloped disaster response and coordination mechanism. Common problems identified include:

=== Initiation/barriers to entry ===
In cases of major disaster, it is very rare that a state will refuse international assistance (the case of Burma was a unique situation). Instead, the more common problem is delay in the issuance of a formal request for such assistance or in the response to international offers. This could be due to weaknesses in national procedures and regulations for needs assessment and decision-making.

=== Legal facilities for operation ===
Even where consent is given for humanitarian operations, there are often problems with visas and travel restrictions. Disaster personnel are often granted entry on tourist or other temporary visas, which can cause subsequent problems with renewal and efforts to obtain work permits. Customs formalities are also a frequent problem, with relief goods held up for long periods of time waiting for clearance. The recognition of domestic legal status is another common problem for international relief providers, particularly for NGOs and foreign Red Cross or Red Crescent societies. The processes are often too slow or difficult to negotiate in emergency settings. Unregistered organisations face various problems, including difficulty opening bank accounts, hiring staff, obtaining visas for workers and tax exemptions. Bilateral agreements, negotiated in advance of an emergency, can be of significant assistance in addressing these issues. Without an agreement is in place, there is little guidance at the international level beyond the general obligation to facilitate aid.

=== Regulation of co-ordination and quality ===
Although affected states are expected to play the leading role in disaster settings, they have in some cases adopted a ‘hands-off’ approach, which has resulted in uneven and uncoordinated international efforts. International legal regulation of the quality of humanitarian assistance is also considered weak. This is due in part to states’ reluctance to create legal frameworks that could threaten control over their borders; and concern by humanitarian actors that quality control regulations could result in loss of independence and freedom of action.

== Recent developments in IDRL ==
Although IDRL is still in a nascent stage and gaps remain in its framework, progress has been made. The adoption of the ‘Guidelines for the Domestic Facilitation and Regulation of International Disaster Relief and Initial Recovery Assistance’ (IDRL Guidelines) by the International Federation of Red Cross and Red Crescent Societies in 2007 is considered to be a significant development. Although these guidelines are non-binding, they are comprehensive in geographic scope, relevant for all sectors and for all types of disasters, and address both state and non-state actors. They aim to foster international agreement on how to address key issues specific to disaster settings. They define the responsibilities of affected states (reinforcing that primary responsibility lies with affected states) and offer a set of recommendations to governments for preparing their domestic laws and systems to manage international assistance during relief efforts. This includes encouraging legal facilities for operation, such as visa, customs and transport facilitation, tax exemptions, and a simplified process for acquiring temporary domestic legal personality. These facilities are conditional on ongoing compliance by humanitarian actors with core humanitarian principles and minimum standards drawn from widely recognised sources, such as the Code of Conduct.

The substance of the guidelines is drawn primarily from international laws, rules, norms and principles; and from lessons and good practice from the field. The guidelines have achieved broad international support. State parties to the Geneva Conventions adopted these guidelines at the International Conference of the Red Cross and Red Crescent in 2007. Moreover, several countries have already adopted new regulations or administrative rules based on or inspired by the guidelines. The International Law Commission (ILC), an expert body of the UN charged with codifying customary international law, has also been engaging in advancing the framework for disaster response. Its programme on the ‘Protection of Persons in the Event of Disasters’ is aimed at developing a legally binding framework at the global level. Draft articles include attention to humanitarian principles; the duty of states to seek assistance when their national response capacity is exceeded; the duty not to arbitrarily withhold consent to external assistance; and the right of the international community to offer assistance.
