= Eunice Randall =

American radio announcer

Eunice Randall Thompson
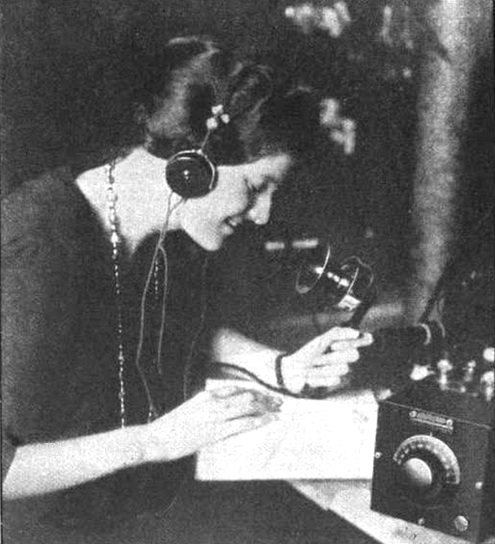
- Born: 15 July 1898; Mattapoisett, Massachusetts
- Died: 13 December 1982 (aged 84)
- Other names: The Radio Girl, Story Lady, Radio Mother, OW of 1XE
- Occupations: Boston's first female announcer and engineer
- Spouse: George Kenneth "Ken" Thompson
- Relatives: George Randall (nephew)
- Call sign: ER, 1CDP, 1ZE and K4GBZ

Eunice Randall (1898–1982) was a pioneering figure in early radio broadcasting and one of the first female radio engineers in the United States. Born in Swansea, Massachusetts, she joined AMRAD (American Radio and Research Corporation) in the 1910s, where she became a key part of station 1XE (later WGI) in Medford Hillside, Massachusetts. Randall worked as an announcer, scriptwriter, and engineer, earning the nickname "The Radio Girl."

In addition to her technical work, Randall entertained listeners with children's bedtime stories and educational programs, helping to broaden radio's appeal to families. She also played a vital role in repairing and maintaining radio equipment—a field dominated by men at the time. After leaving the broadcasting industry, she became a draftsman for the Boston Edison Company. Randall was also active in the Girl Scouts and supported amateur radio clubs throughout her life.

== Early life ==
Eunice Randall, born 15 July 1898, was raised on a farm in Mattapoisett, Massachusetts. She built a receiver on the farm so her family could listen to her broadcasts and taught herself morse code and ham radio.

Her great niece recalls that she had a tall stature at 6"4' tall, and that she had deep rich contralto. She also sung.

She had a notable friendship with Irving Vermilya, who held the first radio license. He had previously picked up her amateur codes, becoming a lifelong teacher, mentor and friend.

== Career in Radio ==
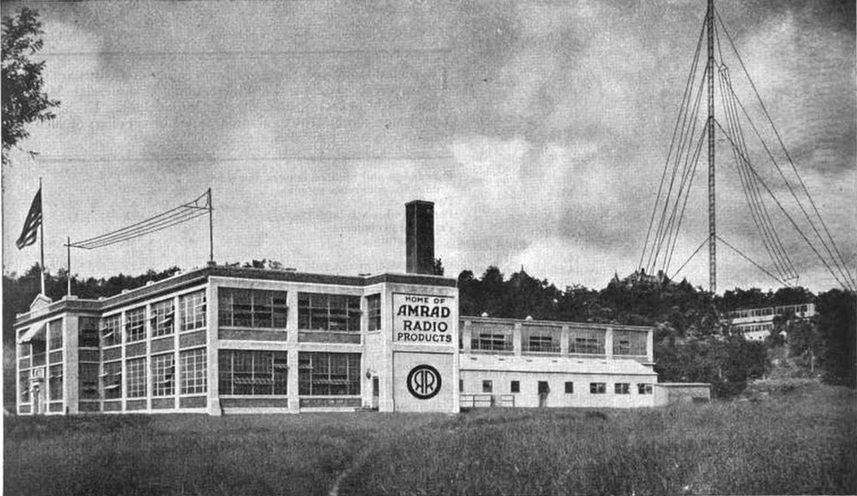
AMRAD factory, Medford Hillside, Massachusetts.

Eunice moved to Boston with the intention of studying art. Eunice was considered unusual as a woman in a technical profession.

Eunice was the first female radio engineer for the American Radio and Research Company (AMRAD). In 1919, she became an announcer for broadcast station 1XE on Medford Hillside after AMRAD opened it in 1918, becoming the first woman on air in Boston.

Between 1919 and 1921, she announced for 1XE, helped with engineering at the station, and sent out code to support amateur learning. Sponsored by Little Folks magazine, she read bedtime stories to children three times a week and became known to the public as "the Story Lady".

In 1922, she went on the air of Boston's first radio station.

Due to AMRAD bankruptcy, 1XE finally went off air in the spring of 1925, ending her career on the air. Eunice continued to work in engineering and participate in ham radio. During WW2, she volunteered with the War Emergency Radio Service (WERS) to support amateurs to get licensing.

== Later life ==
On October 12, 1948, Eunice married George Kenneth "Ken" Thompson (K4RO, ex-W1PS, 2PL), a former AMRAD employee. They would later move to Maine after her retirement. Eunice died 13 December 1982, at the age of 84, of congestive heart failure in Swansea, Massachusetts. She was cremated at the Swan Point Cemetery.
