= Canadian Forces Affiliate Radio System =

Canadian amateur radio program

The Canadian Forces Affiliate Radio System was established in 1978. The programme enlists amateur radio volunteer operators and equipment but uses neither standard radioamateur frequencies nor callsigns as CFARS is allocated its own specific official frequencies and identifiers.

During the Cold War, Canadian troops deployed CFARS radio to military outposts in West Germany. In the 1991 Gulf War, CFARS provided a means for Canadian soldiers stationed in Qatar to call home, boosting morale. On October 6, 2011, a malfunction of Telesat's Anik F2 satellite disrupted communications to Canada's high Arctic region for several hours; CFARS operators were called upon to provide emergency backup communication.

CFARS consists of a mix of military stations (publicly owned and operated by DND personnel), military unit/club amateur radio stations (operated and maintained on military sites by volunteer radio amateurs) and individual affiliate radio stations (which are privately owned and operated by individual radio amateurs affiliated with CFARS). Historically, CFARS stations have also been deployed on Canadian Coast Guard vessels for use during search and rescue deployments.

Agencies actively served by CFARS include the military, Public Safety Canada, Transport Canada and the Royal Canadian Mounted Police.

A counterpart to CFARS exists in the United States of America as the Military Auxiliary Radio System; established procedure is designed to facilitate interoperation between the two systems. While the use of CFARS phone patch traffic in its traditional role as a means for soldiers to contact loved ones is declining with the growing access to communications satellites by military units in the field, the amount of digital radio traffic (such as electronic mail) carried has been increasing.

A working Canadian Forces Affiliate Radio System station is on exhibit as part of the Military Communications and Electronics Museum at CFB Kingston in Kingston, Ontario.

== Frequencies ==
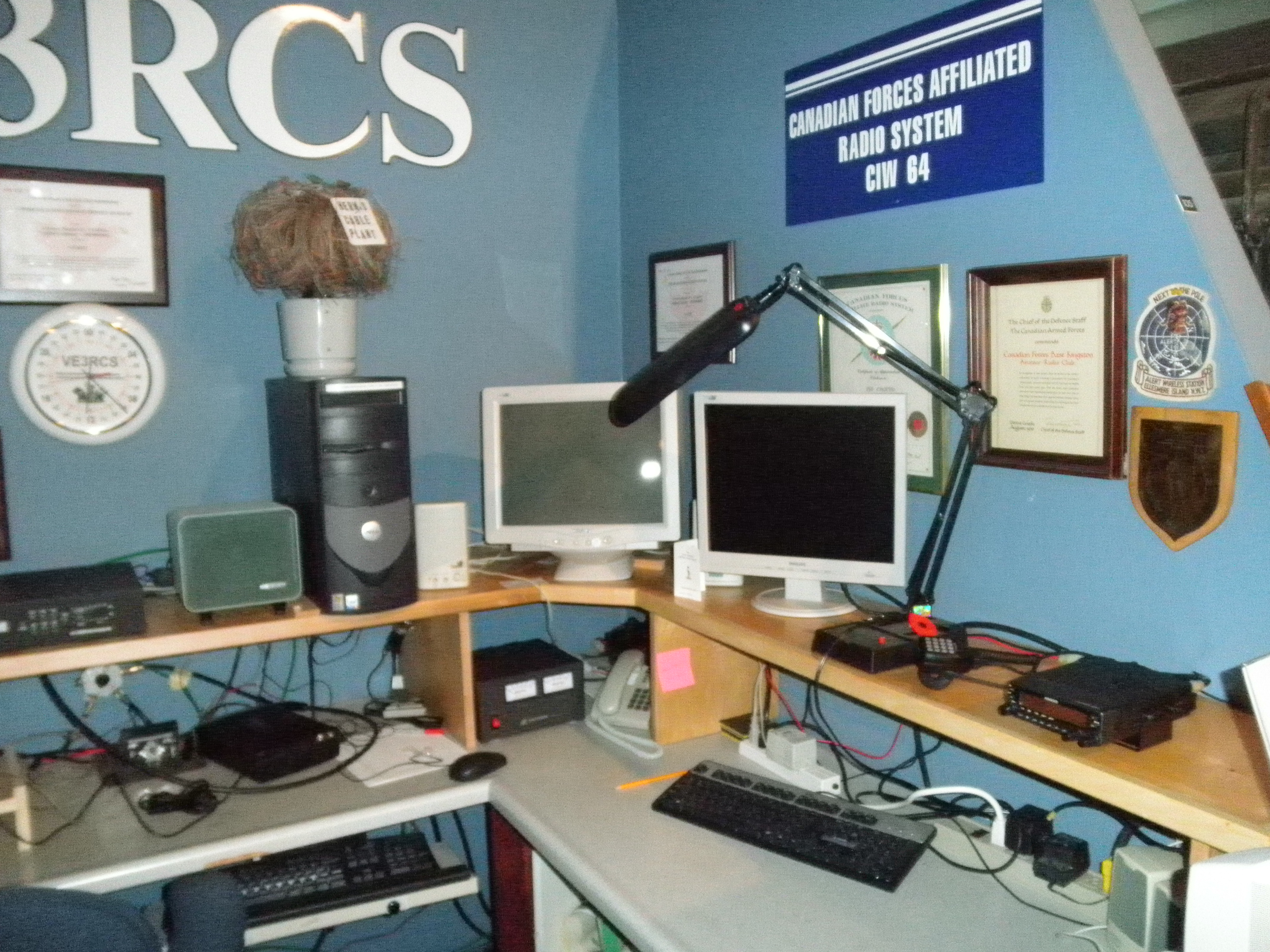
CFARS station CIW64 at CFB Kingston's signals museum

The following frequencies are in use by the Canadian Forces Affiliate Radio System (CFARS) worldwide:

6978 kHz	Alpha
14386 kHz	Bravo
14460 kHz	Charlie
14463 kHz	Delta
14446 kHz	Echo
20971 kHz	Foxtrot
20963 kHz	Golf
29715 kHz	Hotel
14454 kHz	Juliet
14449 kHz	Kilo
20977 kHz	Lima
13954 kHz	Mike
6982 kHz	Whiskey
6962 kHz	Xray
4052 kHz	Yankee
4023 kHz	Zulu

== See also ==
- Military Auxiliary Radio System
- Amateur Radio Emergency Service and Amateur Radio Emergency Communications
