= Wireless Institute of Australia =

National amateur radio society

- Abbreviation: WIA
- Formation: 1910
- Type: Non-profit
- Headquarters: Bayswater, Victoria
- Region served: Australia
- President: Scott Williams (2021-)
- Main organ: Board of Directors
- Affiliations: International Amateur Radio Union
- Website: www.wia.org.au

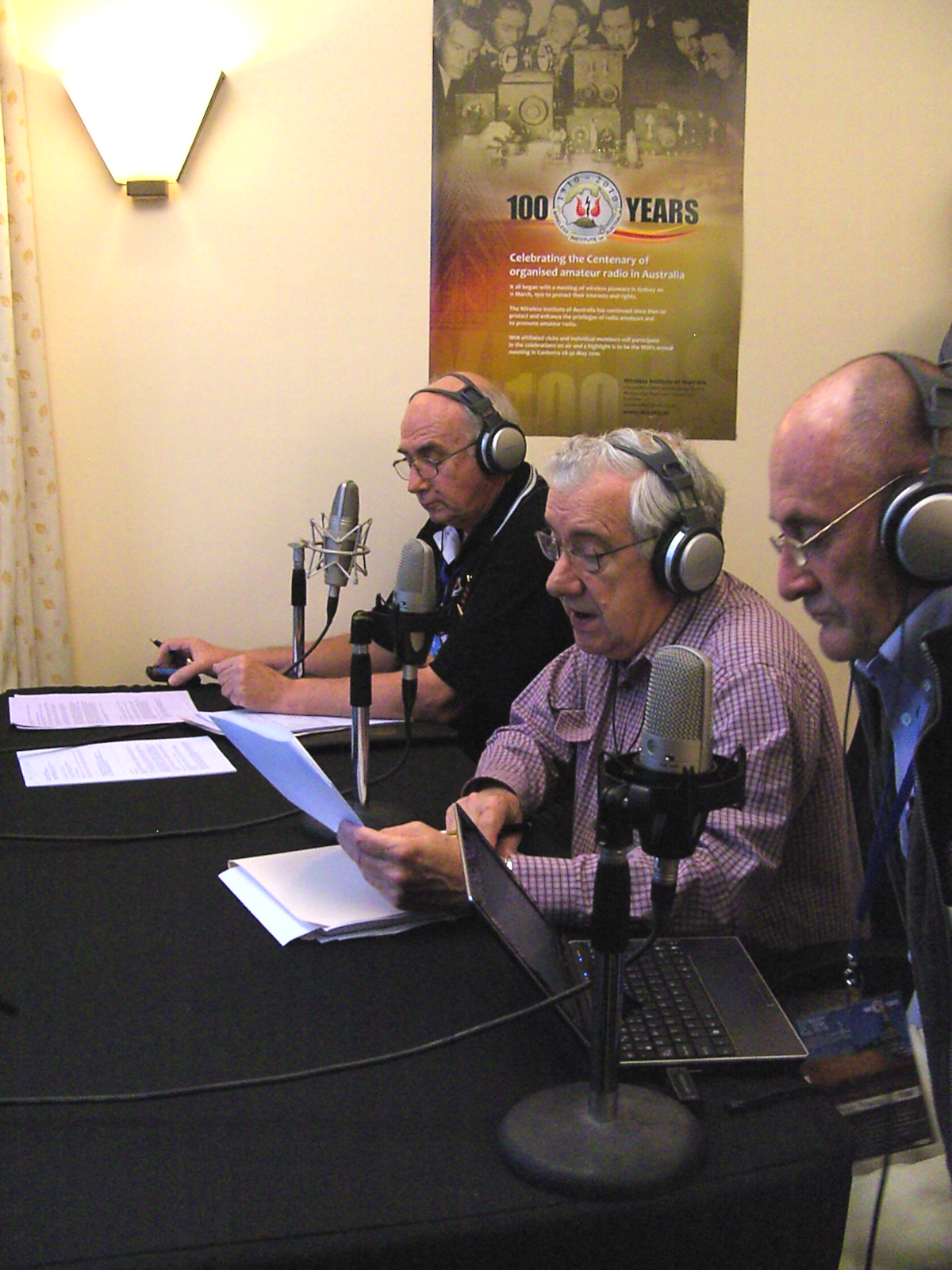
Live broadcast on 30 May 2010 of weekly broadcast of Amateur Radio news in Australia, using the special event callsign VK100WIA commemorating the 100th anniversary of the Wireless Institute of Australia, conducted at the annual general meeting in Canberra, Australian Capital Territory. L-R: Graham Kemp VK4BB (broadcast host), the late Michael Owen VK3KI (then President of the WIA), Peter Young VK3MV (then WIA Director).

The Wireless Institute of Australia (WIA) was formed in 1910, and is the first and oldest national amateur radio society in the world. It represents the amateur radio operators of Australia as the AR "peak body" in dealings with the Australian Communications & Media Authority (ACMA), the authority under the government of Australia that administers communications within and external to Australia. The WIA publishes a bi-monthly journal for its membership called Amateur Radio. The organisation is the national society representing Australia in the International Amateur Radio Union. The WIA holds regular meetings with the ACMA to inform the Authority on matters concerning the Australian amateur radio community.

== Origins ==
The WIA today is a single integrated nationwide body formed at the request of the federal regulator in 2004 to create a single focal point for Amateur Service representation. Originally it commenced as separate, though collegiate, state-based organisations. Throughout most of its history, it was a federation of these state bodies. It traces its origins to the formation in 1910 of the New South Wales Institute of Telegraphy. The Wireless Institute of Victoria was established in 1911. Next came the short-lived Wireless Institute of Queensland, which held its first meeting in May 1912. The Western Australia Radio Club was formed shortly before the First World War.

== ITU World Radio Conference ==
The WIA is the Australian "peak" radio amateur society, being the sole national organisation recognised by the IARU. The WIA has existed for over 100 years (since 1910), and is a foundation member of the IARU (Region 3). The IARU represents Radio Amateur Service and their global spectrum allocations with the International Telecommunication Union (ITU). The ITU, originally the International Telegraph Union, is a specialised agency of the United Nations responsible for issues that concern information and communication technologies. The WRC is held every 3 or 4 years to discuss global terrestrial and satellite communications and agree on the global assignment and use of the RF Spectrum. The WIA most recently attended the WRC-19 and WRC-21 as part of the Australian delegation at the invitation of the Australian Federal Department of Communications.

== Governance ==
On 16 May 2004, the Annual General Meeting adopted a new constitution that established a national organisational structure (seven Directors with individual membership of persons in the national body) versus the former federal arrangement (membership held in state Divisions, and the Divisions having membership of the Federal body).

=== 100th anniversary ===
The 100th anniversary of the WIA was commemorated in 2010. A special event callsign and station was established and used throughout 2010: callsign VK100WIA.

The Annual General Meeting was held in Canberra, Australian Capital Territory, over 28–30 May 2010, and included an inspection of Black Mountain Tower, an ARISS contact with the International Space Station, operator astronaut Tracy Caldwell Dyson, and students from Trinity Christian School, Canberra, and a live broadcast of the weekly WIA news.

== Training and licensing ==
The WIA conducts training sessions and has training materials for people wishing to become licensed amateur radio operators. For over 20 years, the WIA provided exam services for the Radio Amateur qualification, the AOCP. Under the ACMA deed 2009–2019, the testing utilised a system of accredited testers, and issued the authorisations for the ACMA to issue licences.

Between mid-1990 and Feb 2019, the WIA delivered amateur radio examinations, issued certificates, and provided related callsign management services. In 2009 a Deed of Agreement was put in place between the ACMA and the WIA to cover these activities.

A Deed of Agreement was in place, Feb 2019 to Feb 2024, between the ACMA and the Australian Maritime College (AMC) to deliver amateur radio examinations, issue certificates, and manage related callsigns. That Deed has now ended, and the ACMA has taken all previously outsourced activity back in house.

== Emergency communication ==
The Wireless Institute Civil Emergency Network (WICEN) (pronounced 'Wy-sen') trains and rehearses amateur radio operators in amateur radio emergency communications for call-out in civil emergencies. It is organised by state and region, with autonomous bodies in each state linked to that jurisdiction's disaster plan. In most states, WICEN is organised by a committee of the WIA state organisation, but in New South Wales and Victoria, WICEN is separately incorporated. WICEN has been activated for various emergencies, notably in recent years the Black Saturday bushfires on 7 February 2009 in Victoria.

== Contests ==
The WIA sponsors or conducts various Australian and Australasian radio contests.

=== Remembrance Day Contest ===
Amateur radio operators in Australia participate in the Remembrance Day Contest on the weekend nearest Victory in the Pacific Day, 15 August. The competition commemorates amateur radio operators who died during World War II and encourages friendly participation to help improve the operating skills of participants. The contest runs for 24 hours, from 0300 UTC on the Saturday (formerly 0800), preceded by a broadcast including a speech by a dignitary or notable Australian (such as the Prime Minister of Australia, Governor-General of Australia, or a military leader) and the reading of the names of amateur radio operators who are known to have died. It is organised by the WIA, with operators in each Australian state contacting operators in other states, New Zealand, and Papua New Guinea. A trophy is awarded to the state that can boast the greatest rate of participation, based on a formula including: number of operators, number of contacts made, and radio frequency bands used.

== Publications ==
=== Amateur Radio ===
Since October 1933, the WIA has published a monthly magazine reporting upon its activities. The magazine is primarily intended for the members but is available at specialist retailers. From 2018 the publication schedule was altered to bimonthly.

=== Callbook ===
An Amateur Radio licence is a "broadcast" licence, with the requirement to regularly identify the station on-air by way of a callsign. A callbook lists these callsigns with related identification details. The first Australian callbook known to be published was in 1914, four years after the WIA was formed - with war-time gaps in publishing. Since 1954, the WIA has published its "Callbook" as part of a formal agreement with the communications regulator (then the PMG). The regulator then ceased publishing the call book.

The callbook lists the callsigns and contact details of all licensed Australian radio amateurs, together with a range of key information relevant to Australian amateur radio operators. The "Callbook" has typically been published on an annual basis. The licensee data was made available under exclusive arrangement with the regulator of the day (presently Australian Communications and Media Authority). In 2020, the ACMA advised the WIA to commence transitioning away from use of RRL data for callbooks.

=== Books ===
From time to time the WIA produces books on topics specific to Australian amateur radio. The most recent effort (2017) is Wireless Men & Women at War, edited by a team including the WIA historian Peter Wolfenden VK3RV.

== Notable members ==
- Ernest Fisk - first President of the WIA, founder of AWA and pioneer of broadcasting
- Charles Maclurcan - second President of the WIA, pioneer broadcaster through his station 2CM
- Rev John Flynn – founder of the Royal Flying Doctor Service
- Alfred Traeger – Australian radio pioneer
- Florence McKenzie ("Mrs Mac") – Australia's first woman electrical engineer, first licensed woman amateur radio operator, and the first female member of the Wireless Institute of Australia
- Dick Smith VK2DIK – electronics entrepreneur and adventurer
- Michael Owen VK3KI (SK) - Past President of the National WIA
- Phil Fitzherbert VK3FF - has severed over five decades and an active contributor to WIA since the 70s, including technical editor and contributor for their Amateur Radio magazine.
