= Amateur Radio Emergency Communications =

Emergency radio service in New Zealand

- Abbreviation: AREC
- Formation: 1932
- Type: Non-profit organisation
- Purpose: Emergency communications
- Region served: New Zealand
- Website: https://arec.nz/

Amateur Radio Emergency Communications (AREC), formerly the Amateur Radio Emergency Corps, is a service provided by the New Zealand Association of Radio Transmitters (NZART) which provides trained radio communicators and communication systems for emergency situations.

== Mission statement ==
"To be the preferred provider for emergency communications to New Zealand emergency services."

== Objectives ==
- To train and provide competent radio communications personnel, who are suitably skilled in assisting organizations during emergencies.
- To maintain a close liaison with the New Zealand Police for Search and Rescue.
- To maintain a close liaison with Civil Defence in New Zealand.
- To maintain liaison with other community organizations.
- To provide and maintain suitable equipment appropriate to the emergency situation.

== History ==
The Amateur Radio Emergency Corps were formed in the aftermath of the Napier earthquake of 1931. Amateur Radio Operators in the area were key in the maintaining of communications between Napier and the outside world, as the earthquake disabled the Post & Telegraph Department's communication systems. In the months afterward groups of 'Radio Emergency Corps' formed around the country with the purpose of providing the means for radio communication to any part of New Zealand in an emergency. This was eventually nationalized under the NZART. The name was changed to 'Amateur Radio Emergency Communications' in the late 1990s to better reflect the more 'modern' nature of today's communicators.

== Structure ==
AREC Sections - attached to NZART Branches nationwide - are coordinated by a Section leader, who report to Area Managers (4 in total) who in turn report to a National Director and their Deputy. The AREC is a service provided as a component of the New Zealand Association of Radio Transmitters, which is a registered not-for-profit Incorporated Society.

== Callsigns ==
In late 2006 the nationwide Callsign Allocations of ZLxEx/ZLxExx - long recognised as 'Emergency' callsigns and administered by the AREC - were re-prefixed as ZKxEx/ZKxExx. The use of ZK by AREC stations serves to improve the recognition of the special nature of their radio traffic, and allow Amateurs to more easily grant AREC operations priority. This move has been greeted by New Zealand Amateurs as somewhat controversial, as blocks of ZKxxxx callsign space were still occupied by the Niue (ZK2) and Tokelau (ZK3) islands and a perceived risk of AREC stations being confused with 'Rare DX' on HF frequencies.

These concerns were raised with the New Zealand Ministry of Economic Development (now Radio Spectrum Management), and in February 2007 the MED requested that NZART place a hold on the use of ZK2 and ZK3 callsigns.

On August 3, 2012, following an ITU update of the Table of International Call Sign Series, Niue has the entire E6 prefix block and ZK2 became available for AREC use. The issue with Tokelau remains outstanding, with NZART liaising with the RSM, who is in turn liaising with the ITU. In the interim, AREC are using ZK9 as the callsign prefix in the ZL3 area.

== Role ==
The AREC have traditionally provided resource for two complementary but separate areas:

=== Search and Rescue ===
AREC have in the last 50 years established themselves as key contributors of communications resource to the New Zealand Police and before then to the Civil Aviation Department now Civil Aviation Authority of New Zealand who until the 1980s were responsible for search and rescue.

=== Civil Defence ===
AREC maintain ties to local New Zealand Civil Defence and Emergency Management groups at local government levels and liaises with the Ministry of Civil Defence and Emergency Management, which is a part of the Department of the Prime Minister and Cabinet (New Zealand). A National Communications Plan administered by AREC prescribes callsigns, frequencies and Net Control stations in such a way that the AREC should be able to establish communications with any region of New Zealand required in a case of serious emergency, assuming that local AREC sections are active and able to stand up their equipment. National knowledge of the comms plan also allows for neighboring less-affected regions to provide overlapping assistance and/or relay over HF, VHF or UHF frequencies as required.

=== Other ===
AREC sections in various regions may provide additional communications and CIMS-related support. This includes applications such as firefighting, where specialized communication skills and adaptable radio systems can be utilized.

== Specialist Equipment ==
Amateur Radio Operators are known for innovation in communication circles. AREC capitalizes on this innovation - privately designed and built equipment features heavily in what have become established communications solutions.

Examples of AREC equipment include:

- Portable Hand-held Radio Equipment - many AREC sections maintain a set of (usually VHF) handheld radios, generally programmed for commercial 'Emergency Services' bands for direct compatibility with Police, Defence, Maritime and other emergency services. These are usually issued one-per-search-party. AREC members may or may not be formal members of the incident team, this usually depends on experience or qualification, perhaps through involvement with Police, LandSAR, or Tramping Clubs. AREC provide both the equipment and training in their use. AREC is also assisting with or directly deploying GPS based radio tracking of search teams to improve incident management team awareness.
- Amateur Radio Fixed Repeaters - the pre-existing 'permanent' repeaters that cover much of New Zealand on both VHF (2m) and UHF (70 cm) frequencies often provide well known performance and coverage over an AREC event area. When AREC stations come up on a frequency, all other stations are required by good operating practice to give that station priority. The repeater would be left for AREC operation until the AREC event came to a close.
- National System - a well established New Zealand wide network of linked Amateur Radio analog UHF (70 cm) repeaters.
- DMR Network - a growing New Zealand wide network of linked Amateur Radio digital UHF (70 cm) DMR repeaters based on the ETSI Digital mobile radio standard.
- Short-Term Special-Purpose (STSP) Repeaters - these are VHF or UHF repeaters designed to operate in a conventional fashion, but be highly portable. Their licenses allow them to be relocated as/when required and they can usually be transported easily in your average car. Typically these would be located on a high point providing line-of-site to a search area or emergency zone, providing enhanced range for VHF or UHF radio equipment. These may be either commercial or custom designs.
- Crossband Repeaters - Similar to an STSP, but usually based on a COTS dualband transceiver with native cross-band repeat functionality. These have the advantage of being very portable - a crossband repeater based on a Dual-band Hand-held Transceiver can be transported, complete with antenna and mast, by 2 trampers. This would include an external 12V battery power supply capable of running the unit for a number of days. Crossband units are often inserted into areas of bush or scrub via Helicopter, with a Search Party (made up of tramping club members or LandSAR volunteers and/or Police staff) conducting the actual installation. Commercial type approved equipment is required for use on the commercial and government frequencies used for SAR operations.

Repeaters provide means by which VHF or UHF handheld radios can have their effective range greatly improved. VHF and UHF equipment has a significant size advantage over HF equipment, which typically requires antennas several meters long in length and are as such unsuitable for portable operation, especially in areas of dense bush.

- Portable High Frequency (HF) Radio Equipment - HF sets are considered by some as 'older technology' and are generally much less portable and flexible than their VHF or UHF equivalents, however, they are a retained capability with several distinct advantages (by virtue of not being limited by line-of-sight). Their use requires a little more training, and often some initial setup (typically the running out of a long-wire antenna close to the ground for Near vertical incidence skywave propagation) - but in some circumstances HF radios will be by far the better performer over VHF/UHF equipment. There is also a useful liaison with the various New Zealand mountain radio services who provide rental HF portable radios for back country walkers and trampers. Police Search and Rescue are also active users of portable HF radio in appropriate situations.

The combination of frequencies and equipment used in a given situation is usually determined case-by-case, or by local AREC standard practise. It has been observed that VHF/UHF crossbanding technology is more commonly used in the North Island where HF equipment is more commonly used in the South Island. However, there are many local exceptions.

== Training ==
AREC has a nationally directed training programme which is administered section-by-section through the AREC Section Leader. Generally speaking, an AREC member is expected to be an expert in the following areas:

- Radio Operation Techniques - terminology, phonetics and 'net control' skills as applicable to high-traffic, high-stress situations.
- Setup / Configuration of equipment utilized by the local AREC Section
- General knowledge of radio equipment
- Coordinated Incident Management System (CIMS) familiarity
- Basic Fault Identification and Remediation - for Radio Equipment

Other complementary skills often found within AREC members include:

- Knowledge of Civil Defense or Emergency Services Procedures
- Computing and general Communications expertise
- Data Entry / Keyboard skills
- Management / Organizational Skills
- "Be Prepared" attitude. Members are often called upon to respond at short notice and be out in the field overnight or longer.
- 4WD or off-roading experience
- Tramping / Bushcraft / Tracking & Trailing knowledge/experience
- Emergency Management skills - esp within the CIMS infrastructure.

=== Sports & Cultural Events ===
AREC regularly use volunteer contributions to sporting and cultural events as training for their communications methods and equipment. One notable event in New Zealand is the Rally of New Zealand, a World Rally Championships stage during which AREC provides a substantial number of volunteer radio operators for control, safety and results traffic handling. These events provide an excellent opportunity to practise the establishment of portable radio equipment in the field, as well as a Headquarters facility and mobile stations. Radio traffic during the course of the event provides an opportunity to practise message handling procedures both in the field and at Rally HQ.

Other events AREC may participate in include Cycle Events, Marathons, Santa Parades, 4WD events and Horse Treks, as examples. Any situation requiring reliable radio comms in a slightly unconventional environment, may be able to benefit from AREC involvement. The alternative is often the use of Cellular Phones (unsuitable in poor coverage areas) or commercial (costly) radio providers.

== Awards and recognition ==
In recognition of their contribution to Search and Rescue, AREC were awarded the Inaugural New Zealand National SAR Award in 2001. They were nominated for the award by New Zealand LandSAR Inc. for their long commitment to SAR in New Zealand - in all classes of search.

The wording on the award is:

"The Award is presented to Amateur Radio Emergency Communications in recognition of their outstanding performance and contribution to Search and Rescue in the New Zealand Region, particularly the skilled communications personnel and technical capabilities that have established them as the preferred provider of emergency communications in support of Search and Rescue in New Zealand"

== Similar Organizations elsewhere in the world ==
- ARES - Amateur Radio Emergency Service (United States)
- DARES - Dutch Amateur Radio Emergency Service (The Netherlands)
- RACES - Radio Amateur Civil Emergency Service (United States)
- RAYNET - Radio Amateurs Emergency Network (United Kingdom)
- DARC - Radio Amateurs Network (Germany)

== See also ==
- NetHope
