= QCWA =

QCWA may stand for:

- Quarter Century Wireless Association
- Queensland Country Women's Association, women's organisation in Australia
