= The Canadian Amateur =

Canadian amateur radio magazine

- Editor: Alan Griffin
- Categories: Amateur radio
- Frequency: Bimonthly
- Publisher: Radio Amateurs of Canada
- Country: Canada
- Based in: Ottawa
- Language: English and French
- Website: http://www.rac.ca/tca/
- ISSN: 0834-3977

The Canadian Amateur (TCA) is a bimonthly amateur radio enthusiast magazine published in Canada. The magazine is published in English and French and draws its subscription base of 4,500 members primarily from Canada. The magazine is published six times per year by the Radio Amateurs of Canada. It is a membership journal that is included in membership with the RAC. The headquarters is in Ottawa.

It has been published since 1973.
