= Salvation Army Team Emergency Radio Network =

Volunteer amateur radio operators aiding Salvation Army emergency disaster services

- Abbreviation: SATERN
- Formation: 1988
- Website: https://centralusa.salvationarmy.org/usc/satern-program/

The Salvation Army Team Emergency Radio Network (SATERN) is a network of volunteer amateur radio operators based in North America. It works to provide emergency communications between Salvation Army posts during times of disaster, and to pass messages with health and welfare information between the Salvation Army and the general public.

In the 1950s, the Salvation Army ran the Salvationist Amateur Radio Operators Fellowship. By 1958, SAROF members were providing help in communications during emergencies. The group continued until 2016.

In the 1980s, several SAROF members discussed how to make this assistance more formal. SATERN was officially founded on June 25, 1988, with its first real test coming three months later during Hurricane Gilbert.

SATERN is open to amateur radio operators of all license classes, and of any (or no) religious faith. SATERN routinely operates on VHF and HF ham bands but may operate any mode on any amateur radio frequency during an event.

During the Northeast blackout of 2003, the group was active in upstate New York as well as the Salvation Army headquarters in Manhattan.

In 2005, SATERN handled over 20,000 health and welfare inquiries during Hurricane Katrina. Along with Skywarn, Hurricane Watch Net and Waterway net, SATERN provided information to the National Hurricane Center. SATERN also worked with the American Red Cross.

On May 5, 2011, during the 2011 Joplin Tornado, SATERN participants provided communication between Freeman Hospital and other hospitals for approximately 12 hours. SATERN equipment was used by emergency coordinators to communicate with Red Cross offices until 12:30 AM.

In 2018, Ford donated a customized Transit Van to SATERN in Kansas City, Missouri to use for mobile communications.

In June 2022, SATERN launched an international SSB Net on 14.325 MHz, with Hurricane Watch Net.

SATERN has expanded overseas, with operators based in Australia, Bermuda, Southeast Asia, the Caribbean, Central and South America, Europe, the Middle East and New Zealand.

== See also ==
- Amateur Radio Emergency Service
- Radio Amateur Civil Emergency Service
- Mennonite Disaster Service
