= Amateur radio emergency communications =

Fallback service

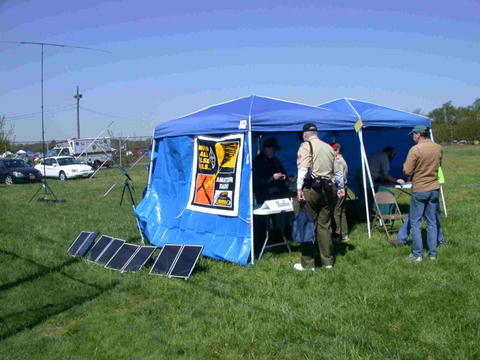
Solar-powered Amateur Radio Station in tents. Note the portable VHF/UHF satellite and HF antennas in the background

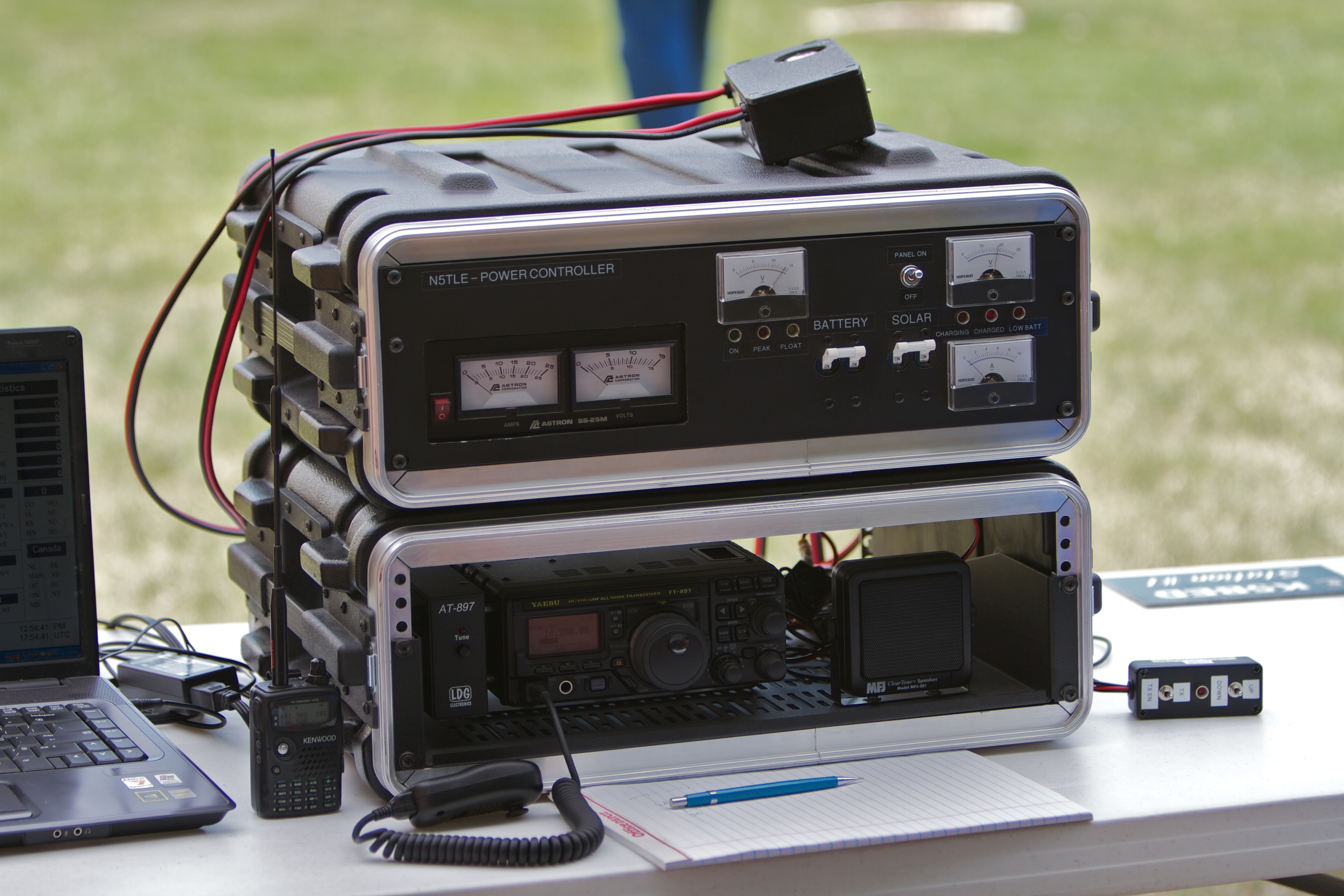
Rugged HF transceiver for voice communications

In times of crisis and natural disasters, amateur radio is often used as a means of emergency communication when wireline, cell phones and other conventional means of communications fail.

Unlike commercial systems, amateur radio is usually independent of terrestrial facilities that can fail. It is dispersed throughout a community without "choke points" such as cellular telephone sites that can be overloaded.

Amateur radio operators are experienced in improvising antennas and power sources and most equipment today can be powered by an automobile battery. Annual "Field Days" are held in many countries to practice these emergency improvisational skills. Amateur radio operators can use hundreds of frequencies and various communications modes to quickly establish networks tying disparate agencies together to enhance interoperability.

Recent examples include the September 11 attacks on the World Trade Center in Manhattan in 2001, the 2003 North America blackout and Hurricane Katrina in September 2005, where amateur radio was used to coordinate disaster relief activities when other systems failed. In 2017, the Red Cross requested 50 amateur radio operators be dispatched to Puerto Rico to provide communications services in the wake of Hurricane Maria.

On September 2, 2004, ham radio was used to inform weather forecasters with information on Hurricane Frances live from the Bahamas. On December 26, 2004, an earthquake and resulting tsunami across the Indian Ocean wiped out all communications with the Andaman Islands, except for a DX-pedition that provided a means to coordinate relief efforts.

Recently, amateur radio operators in the People's Republic of China provided emergency communications after the 2008 Sichuan earthquake and U.S. hams did similar work following Hurricane Ike. Amateur radio operators provided communications in the aftermath of the Boston Marathon bombing when cellphone systems became overloaded.

The largest disaster response by U.S. amateur radio operators was during Hurricane Katrina which first made landfall as a Category 1 hurricane went through Miami, Florida on August 25, 2005, eventually strengthening to Category 5. More than a thousand ham operators from all over the U.S. converged on the Gulf Coast in an effort to provide emergency communications assistance. Subsequent Congressional hearings highlighted the Amateur Radio response as one of the few examples of what went right in the disaster relief effort.

== Organization ==
While all hams have some emergency communications capability, those who are particularly interested in the public service aspects of the hobby usually affiliate with an organized group for disaster specific training, quick mobilization and to practice emergency skills. These major organizations include:

=== International ===
The Global Amateur Radio Emergency Communications Conference (GAREC) is held in a new location yearly by the International Amateur Radio Union (IARU), hosting discussion and coordination of large-scale and cross-border amateur radio emergency response.

=== Australia ===
In Australia, the Wireless Institute Civil Emergency Network operates in each state & territory as an autonomous body under the relevant disaster plan.

=== Austria ===
In Austria, Amateur Radio Emergency Network Austria (ARENA) is a national voluntary service that is provided to the community by licensed radio amateurs. ARENA is part of the OEVSV and IARU - the national and international amateur radio associations.

=== Canada ===
In Canada, the RAC Auxiliary Communications Service (ACS) is organized by the Radio Amateurs of Canada. Often other less formal networks of volunteer radio operators are also used and organized by the local emergency response agencies in conjunction with local ham radio operators. As in the United States, Radio Amateurs of Canada has memoranda of understanding with numerous agencies expected to receive services, including the Canadian Red Cross and Salvation Army.

=== Chile ===
In Chile, Servicio de Emergencia de Radioaficionados (CE3SER) is sponsored by the Radio Club de Chile (CE3AA) and associated clubs around the country, and maintain active Agreements of Cooperation with the National Emergency Office (ONEMI), Air Force, Army, and the Navy branch in charge of the maritime territory. It operates daily the national emergency network (Red Chilena NorAustral de Servicios, RECNA) in HF, and locally in VHF-UHF. These exercises are performed on 80, 40, 20, 15 meters, and also locally in the main cities on VHF and UHF. The nets are open to all Chilean amateurs, whether or not members of RCCH, and also to international amateurs. Radio amateurs' involvement and cooperation in earthquakes and other national emergencies has been publicly acknowledged and thanked by the President of the Republic, several times during the last years Radio Club de Chile has cooperated with other countries' amateurs—notably those of Nicaragua—in the organization and operation of emergency communications via ham radio. At the beginning of July 2018, CE3SER, the former station of Servicio de Emergencias de Radioaficionados begun doing its exercises in the BrandMeister digital network also. They operate in the TG 730911 with this novel initiative in DMR digital communications.

=== Croatia ===
In Croatia, SRVKS or RCSS – Radio Communication Systems in Crisis Situation is an independent association that brings together citizens, and especially licensed radio amateurs who pursue personal and common interests and public needs in the protection and rescue system.

=== Ireland ===
In the Republic of Ireland, the Amateur Radio Emergency Network co-ordinates emergency communications activities on behalf of the Irish Radio Transmitters Society (IRTS). AREN membership is, however, open to all amateur radio operators, whether members of IRTS or not.

=== Malaysia ===
In Malaysia, the Malaysian Radio Amateur Civil Emergency Service (MyRACES) a sub division under registered organization MALAYSIAN AMATEUR RADIO TRANSMITTERS' SOCIETY (MARTS) is a Member of International Amateur Radio Union (IARU). MyRACES provide voluntary emergency communications during disaster.

=== Netherlands ===
The Dutch Amateur Radio Emergency Service (DARES) was founded in 2003 as a result of the World Radio Conference 2003, where it was decided that licensed Dutch radio amateurs were allowed to offer their services to third parties when there is an emergency. DARES is recognized by the State Department of The Netherlands and supported by the two largest national radio amateur organisations: VERON and VRZA.

DARES consists of a group of radio amateurs and shortwave listeners who offer their knowledge and radio equipment during a disaster or major incident. The organisation is built upon the 25 safety regions defined by Dutch authorities.

DARES has been represented at the Global Amateur Radio Emergency Communications Conference (GAREC) since 2005.

=== New Zealand ===
In New Zealand the New Zealand Association of Radio Transmitters provides the AREC - Amateur Radio Emergency Communications (formerly Amateur Radio Emergency Corps) in the role. They won the New Zealand National Search and Rescue award in 2001 for their long commitment to Search and Rescue in NZ.

=== South Africa ===
In South Africa, HAMNET is a part of the South African Radio League, and assists with emergency communications co-ordination.

=== Spain ===
In Spain, REMER (Red Radio de Emergencia, Emergency Radio Network) is a national HF/VHF network formed by volunteer ham radio operators, and it is co-ordinated by the local Civil defense groups, which are dependent from the local government authority. It was founded on 1982.

=== Russia ===
The volunteer organization called RAS formed in 1988, and at the end of 2012, the Union of Russian Radio amateurs established a committee dedicated to emergency communications and even entered into an agreement with MChS, Emergency Situations Ministry.

=== Trinidad and Tobago ===
In Trinidad and Tobago, The Trinidad and Tobago Amateur Radio Society (T.T.A.R.S), the officially recognized body for amateur radio in Trinidad and Tobago, manages the emergency communications arm of the group often referred to as EmComms. EmComms have, in the past, not only been active in Trinidad and Tobago, but throughout the Caribbean. The Office of Disaster Preparedness Management (ODPM) is actively involved in amateur radio and maintains an active amateur radio station and five repeaters.

=== United Kingdom ===
In the United Kingdom Radio Amateurs Emergency Network (RAYNET) provides the organizational backbone of their amateur radio emergency communications groups along with the Radio Society of Great Britain (RSGB). It was formed in 1953 in the aftermath of the North Sea flood of that year.

=== United States ===
In the United States, there are three major methods of organizing amateur radio emergency communications: the Amateur Radio Emergency Service (ARES), an organization of amateur operators sponsored by the American Radio Relay League (ARRL); Radio Relay International, which provides radio operator certification and organizes radio networks and volunteers to respond to emergencies as outlined in a National Response Plan; and the Radio Amateur Civil Emergency Service (RACES), a standby replacement radio service regulated by the Federal Communications Commission. Operations under the RACES rules requires preregistration with a local civil defense organization, to allow continued operation under Part 97.407 of the FCC regulations in the event the Amateur Radio Service is ever shut down by presidential order. Thus ARES and RACES involvement within the same area are usually intertwined, with many governments requiring membership and service in that locale's ARES organization to allow operations within the Amateur Radio Service as well. Many government Emergency Operations Centers, Red Cross Chapters and National Weather Service facilities have permanent Amateur Radio stations installed for such operations.

The ARRL provides extensive documentation on how to conduct emergency radio communications, including its Public Service Communications Manual.

Radio clubs independent of the ARRL and ARES also participate in emergency communications activities in some areas, and some non-radio organizations have their own amateur arm. The Department of Defense sponsors the Military Auxiliary Radio System (MARS) program which utilizes Amateur Radio operators for emergency communication using military radio frequencies. The National Weather Service Skywarn weather-spotter program has a strong amateur radio contingent. And amateurs dedicated to the Salvation Army are organized under their Salvation Army Team Emergency Radio Network program.

Emergency communications and disaster assistance is usually done in conjunction with volunteer disaster relief organizations such as the American Red Cross, the Salvation Army, local government emergency management agencies, as well as volunteer fire departments and ambulance corps.

The ARRL has memoranda of understanding with numerous agencies expected to receive services, including the American Red Cross and Salvation Army and is a partner in the Citizen Corps program of the Federal Emergency Management Agency (FEMA). The ARRL also is a member of the National Voluntary Organizations Active in Disaster (NVOAD) and conducts emergency communications certification courses for interested Amateur Radio operators.

== See also ==
- Emergency communication system
