= Wireless Institute of Queensland =

Historic radio club in Queensland

The Wireless Institute of Queensland was Queensland's first organised radio club. Formed in 1912, it appears to have ceased operation within a year, but no doubt links formed between members continued through World War I and beyond. As many as 50 persons attended meetings during 1912. The first and only president was Horace Bruce Rockwell, who had only recently arrived from Sydney. There are no reports of meetings after 1912, but many former members continued to hold experimental licences up until the commencement of World War I when all transmitting and receiving privileges were withdrawn by the Postmaster-General. The "Wireless Institute of Queensland" is considered a predecessor organisation to the post World War I "Queensland Wireless Institute" and "Wireless Institute of Australia (Queensland branch)".

Sydney (Syd) Victor Colville (22 March 1894 – 1966) was an Australian broadcast pioneer who, in 1914, established the Wireless Institute of Queensland. He was one of the first amateur radio operators in Australia.

== Balsillie's visit ==
John Graeme Balsillie visited Brisbane in mid April 1912 with the objective of identifying a suitable site for the Brisbane coastal station VIB. Such visits tended to be a little circumspect in case a prospective vendor was encouraged to increase his asking price. A variety of locations were considered, including: Pinkenba, Observatory Hill (the future location of 4CM) and Mt Coot-tha. Reports of Balsillie meeting with WIQ members have not yet been identified, but such meetings were his practice throughout his appointment as Commonwealth Wireless Expert. It seems reasonable to conclude that this visit was a driver for the club's formation, certainly the time proximity is close.

== Preliminary meeting ==
A preliminary meeting with the object of forming the Wireless Institute of Queensland was held on the evening of Tuesday 23 April 1912. It was intended that the club closely reflect the organisation of the Wireless Institute of Australia then based in Sydney, NSW. Lieutenant Sturdee (staff-officer Royal Engineers), was appointed chairman, and those present included Messrs. H. B. C. Rockwell, H. Nelson, G. H. Boundy, G. H. Burnham, P. S. McIvor, J. A. Clark, J. C. Price (later 4FI), J. Ryan, J. Byrne, T. Brownless, P. C. Smith, E. P. Tipping, and F. H. Hellawell, while apologies were received from Messrs. J. Power, J. W. Sutton, E. B. Corbett, E. H. Bourne, T. S. Smith, F. Passey, and P. Tate.

Bruce Rockwell had only recently arrived from Sydney where he was an active holder of an experimental licence. He had prepared himself for the meeting and gave an interesting exposition of the progress of the institute in New South Wales, also reading the rules and regulations adopted by the WIA. For those not already versed in the science, he also gave a brief description of wireless telegraphy, and of the apparatus devised by himself, which apparatus was to be used, for experimental purposes in connection with the WIQ. Rockwell was connected with the military and flagged that permission was already being sought from the Commandant of the Queensland military forces, to erect suitable aerials on vacant ground, the property of the defence force.

A working committee was formed for the purpose of securing names of intending members, and communicating with those interested in the subject, the committee comprising Messrs. Rockwell, H. Nelson, E. H. Bourne, T. Brownless, and G. H. Boundy, together with Mr. F. H. Hellawell (electrical engineers' branch, G.P.O.), as acting secretary, who was to receive names of intending members. The proposed activities included provision of wireless apparatus for use by the members, provision of a technical reference library and wireless technical instruction for members.

== First meeting and appointment of officers ==
The first meeting of the WIQ was held on Wednesday, 8 May 1912, when some 49 members were enrolled. Lieutenant Sturdee (staff officer, Royal Engineers) was in the chair. Apologies were received from Major Annand, Messrs. F. E. Ramsbotham, James Ryan, F. A. Bignell, J. R. Clark, E. P. Tipping, Price, C. McLaughlan, C. Ive, and D. Nagel. It was resolved to adopt the name of the Wireless Institute of Queensland, the objects and aims being "to encourage the scientific study of wireless telegraphy in Queensland, and to promote the intercourse of those interested in the subject, and to aid them with advice and instruction." The constitution of the New South Wales body was, in the main, adopted, with minor alterations. The subscription was fixed at 10s. 6d. per annum, ladies also being eligible for membership. The following officers were elected: President, Mr. H. C. B. Rockwell; vice-presidents, Messrs. S. H. Smith, E. P. Seckold, E. B. Corbett, E. H. Bourne; secretary, Mr. F. H. Hellawell; treasurer, Mr. P. C. Smith; committee, Lieutenant Sturdee, Messrs. H. Nelson, A. G. Jackson, G. H. Boundy, C. Cheetham, T. Brownlee, Heffernan, R. A. Sellars, leaving four names still to be elected. A committee, consisting of the president, secretary, and one member of the council, had the superintendence of the laboratory, instruments, and library. It was noted that Messrs. Kerr, Haines, J. Jeffries, J. Connoh, and Sergeant McLennan, and others valuably contributed to the discussion. A hearty vote of thanks to the chairman concluded the meeting.

== Second meeting ==
The second meeting of the WIQ was held on Wednesday, 15 May 1912. The president (Mr. H. C. B. Rockwell) was in the chair, and after routine work of the meeting, he gave the first of a series of lectures on wireless. His subject was "The Loose Coupling Induction Tuner," the use and adjustment of this instrument being lucidly explained and illustrated by diagrams. Mr. Rockwell also exhibited his own instrument, which was carefully examined by the members, and pertinent questions thereon being eagerly asked and were answered to the satisfaction of all. It was announced that further lectures on related topics would be given by Rockwell and also by other members of the institute from time to time.

== Third meeting ==
The third meeting of the Wireless Institute of Queensland was held in the P.P.L. Rooms, Kent's Building on Thursday, 23 May 1912. About 50 members were present. Rockwell delivered a very interesting lecture on "Electric and Magnetic Wave Motion and Production," and exhibited to the members an ascending helix, the function and directions for the construction of which he clearly explained. He noted that in two months time, when the full complement of his wireless outfit would arrive from Sydney, and when the institute would have a properly equipped room; every alternative meeting would be devoted to practice in wireless operating. The meeting concluded with a hearty vote of thanks to the lecturer.

== Fourth meeting ==
By the time of the fourth meeting of the WIQ, held on Wednesday, 12 June 1912, the institute had its own room at the Imperial Chambers and frequency of meetings had been reduced to fortnightly. There were only about 30 members present, including a few ladies. Rockwell delivered an interesting lecture on "Magnetic Wave Action," during which he explained, and advocated, the use of silicon detectors. It was foreshadowed that Mr Balsillie would deliver a lecture to members during his visit to Brisbane, but it appears that this did not eventuate.

== Fifth meeting ==
The WIQ's fifth meeting was held in its room at Imperial Chambers on Wednesday, 26 June 1912. More new members were enrolled, among them being a few ladies who are already engaged in telephone work in the Post and Telegraph Department. Rockwell took for the subject of his lecture, "The Rival of Radiotelegraphy," and discussed with the members the principle of using the earth as a medium, in place of the air. The secretary (Mr. F. H. Hellawell) announced that arrangements for installing instruments for the practical classes were being expedited, and that as many as 20 members at a time would be able to receive the wave signals. The meeting concluded with a vote of thanks to the lecturer.

== Hiatus - July 1912 ==
There appears to have been a hiatus in public WIQ activities during July 1912, perhaps due to focus on the construction of VIB. Prior to the commencement of VIB, wireless experimentalists had only sporadic nearby transmitters to listen to for strong signals. With the advent of VIB strong signals were routinely available. The 160 ft mast was erected on Saturday, 13 July 1912, with Scott the officer-in-charge and Munson the assistant. Both officers had been already involved with several coastal station projects and were about to embark on establishment of a full network for Queensland (including VIR, VIT, VIC and VII) and Papua (VIG). The process of raising the mast with a secondary jury mast was a visual spectacular and would have attracted a large audience including many wireless experimentalists.

== Sixth Meeting ==
A sixth meeting of the WIQ was announced for Wednesday, 1 August 1912 to be held at their room at the Imperial Chambers. No published report of the meeting has yet been identified.

== Apparent last meeting ==
A meeting of the WIQ was announced to take place at their room in the Imperial Chambers on Wednesday, 6 November 1912. Again, no published report of the meeting has yet been identified and it is assumed that formal activities of the club ceased at this point.

== Promotional activities ==
Bruce Rockwell undertook a number of promotional activities in his capacity as President of the WIQ. He attended the Institute of Engineers annual dinner at Rowe's Cafe in Brisbane in May 1912. A toast to "Kindred Associations" by Edward Gustavus Campbell Barton, was responded to in respect of the WIQ by Rockwell. On Friday, 2 August 1912, Rockwell delivered a lecture on "Wireless Telegraphy" at a large gathering of the Institute of Engineers in their new rooms in Queen street. Attendees directed pertinent questions to the lecture and the meeting was clearly lively. Reference was made to Rockwell's own invention of a more efficient crystal detector and recent successes by Sydney amateurs in communicating with the Australasian Antarctic Expedition at Macquarie Island and Adelie Land, as well as Western Australia. Rockwell also delivered a lecture on the subject of Wireless Telegraphy to the Wynnum and Manly Sailing Club at the Gordon Club rooms on Tuesday, 1 October 1912. As well as the lecture, a miniature wireless station was fitted up permitting a practical demonstration of transmitting and reception. In October 1912, Bruce Rockwell also attended an "At Home" by the president of the Queensland Institute of Architects (Mr. A. B. Wilson).

== List of Amateurs Pre-WWI ==
In the year 1914, the first official list of Australian Wireless Experimenters was published and fortunately a single copy survives in the archives of the WIA. The list is now regarded as incomplete, as it shows only 10 Queenslanders out of a total of several hundred experimenters.

Call Sign	Name	Location
XQA	M. J. G. Brims	Mareeba
XQB	L. Freeman	Rockhampton
XQC	R.H. Berry	Rockhampton
XQD	H.A. Shepherd	Rockhampton
XQF	S.V. Colville	South Brisbane
XQG	G.H. Gibson	Brisbane
XQH	H.B. Rockwell	Wynnum
XQI	W.H. Hannam	Stamford
XQJ	A.G. Bamfield	Corfield
XQK	C. Wicks	South Brisbane
