= Military Communications and Electronics Museum =

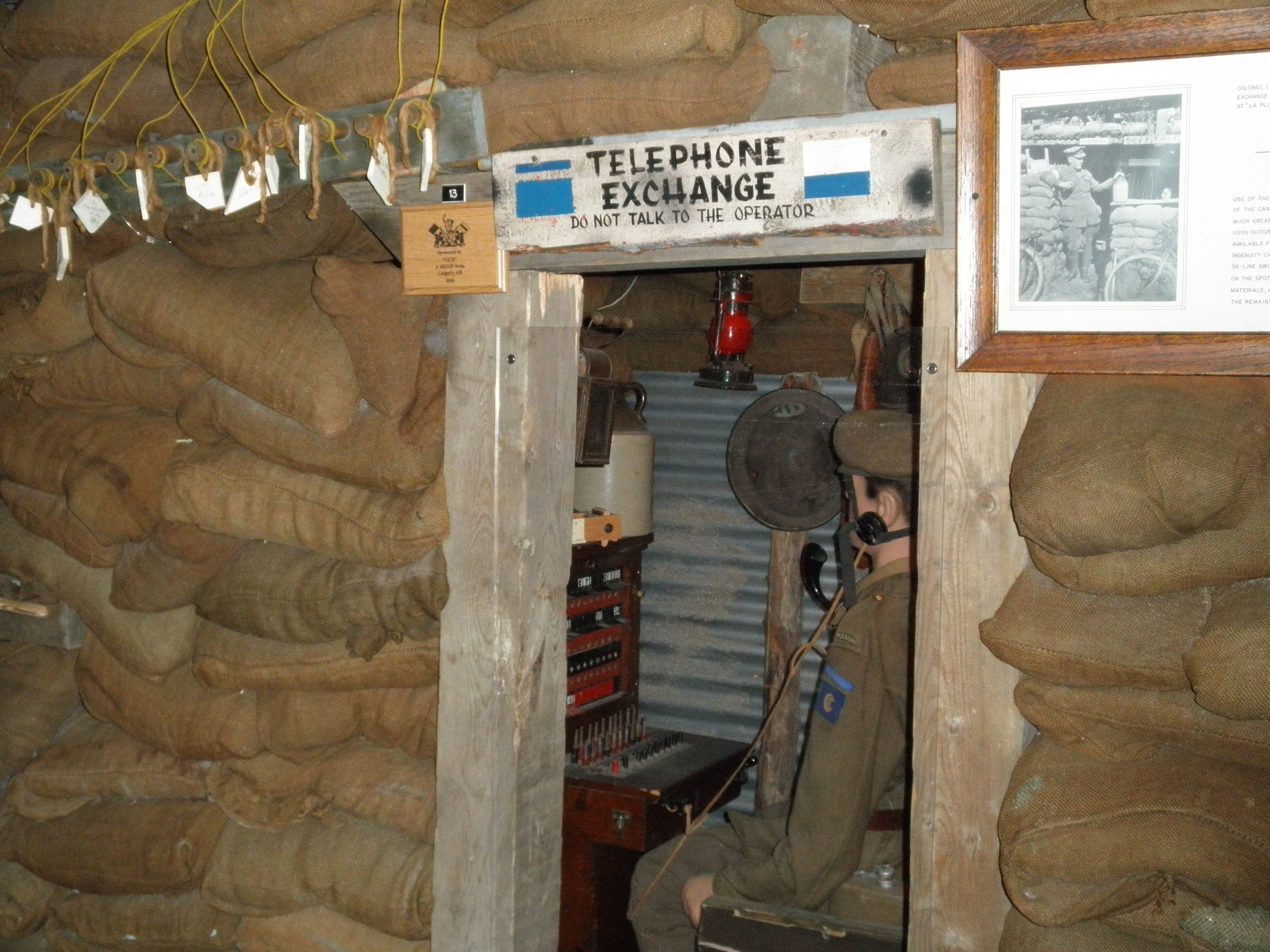
- Established: 1961
- Location: Hwy 2 at Craftsman Blvd, Kingston, Ontario
- Coordinates: 44.2423°N 76.4399°W
- Type: military museum
- Collection size: 5000 items, 10000 square feet
- Director: Rory M. Cory
- Curator: Annette Elizabeth Gillis VA3VAI
- Owner: CFB Kingston
- Public transit access: 12A, E12
- Parking: on-site
- Website: www.candemuseum.org

The Military Communications and Electronics Museum (Musée de l'électronique et des communications militaires) is a military signals museum on Ontario Highway 2 at CFB Kingston in Kingston, Ontario, Canada. A member organisation of the Organization of Military Museums of Canada, the communications museum was established at the base in 1961 and moved to its current purpose-built building in 1996.

Described by Lonely Planet as "a comprehensive and well-designed museum offering chronological displays on communications technology and sundry military gadgets", the museum traces the development of military communications from 1903 onward, through World War I and II, the Korean War and various NATO and United Nations peacekeeping missions to the modern era of communications satellites.

== Exhibits ==
Canadian soldiers are represented by mannequins in military uniform of the appropriate eras manning fixed communications posts, heavily sandbagged underground dugouts and military vehicles while operating military communications equipment. The history of Canadian electronic military signals dates from 1903, when the militia-based Canadian Signal Corps was established as the first of its kind in the Commonwealth. Exhibits are arranged chronologically from the World War I era to the recent International Security Assistance Force mission in Afghanistan.

Artefacts of the Great War include a cable wagon restored by local signallers, a switchboard from the first deployments of telephone communications in directing artillery, Morse code equipment and gas masks which signallers would have had to keep at the ready in the event of chemical attack.

The use of encryption, signals intelligence and counterintelligence is also documented, particularly in the World War II era where a break in the Enigma machine cipher by Allied forces would prove to be of decisive strategic value.

Two of the radar antennas from CFS Ramore were donated to the Military Communications and Electronics Museum in Kingston upon Ramore’s closure.

=== Canadian Forces Affiliate Radio System ===
The museum also displays a complete, working radioamateur station as a gateway in the Canadian Forces Affiliate Radio System (CFARS); the station's callsigns are CIW64 (CFARS), CIW964 (CFARS gateway) and VE3RCS (radioamateur service). The Canadian Forces Affiliate Radio System was established in 1978. The programme enlists amateur radio volunteer operators and equipment but uses neither standard radioamateur frequencies nor callsigns as CFARS is allocated its own specific official frequencies and identifiers

=== Canada mourning her fallen sons ===
A war memorial "Canada mourning her fallen sons" is part of the museum and incorporates three plaster models created by sculptor Walter Allward during the design of the Vimy Memorial in France.

=== Semaphore to Satellite ===
A book "Semaphore to Satellite" covering the history of the Canadian Forces Communications and Electronics Branch and its founding elements (Canadian Signalling Corps, Canada Naval Supplementary Radio System and Royal Canadian Air Force Telecommunication Branch) was published in 2013.

== See also ==
- CFB Kingston
- Fort Henry
- Fritz-Julius Lemp
- German submarine U-110 (1940)
- HMS Bulldog (H91)
- Joe Baker-Cresswell
- Kurzsignale
- List of museums in Ontario
- Monteith POW camp Camp 23
