= Tampere Convention =

International multilateral treaty

The Tampere Convention (fully entitled The Tampere Convention on the Provision of Telecommunication Resources for Disaster Mitigation and Relief Operations) is a multilateral treaty governing the provision and availability of communications equipment during disaster relief operations, particularly as regards the transport of radio and related equipment over international boundaries by radio amateurs. It was concluded at the First Intergovernmental Conference on Emergency Telecommunications (ICET-98) in Tampere, Finland, in 1998, and went into effect on 8 January 2005. As of December 2025, there are 50 state parties to the agreement.

The first treaty of its kind, the convention was conceived primarily as a means to influence party states to pursue a set of common expectations regarding freedom and access of persons providing emergency services in disaster situations. Hindrances to the deployment of telecommunications equipment and operators across borders have cost lives in past disasters.

Issues pertinent to the jurisdiction of the Tampere Convention are discussed at the Global Amateur Radio Emergency Communications Conference (GAREC), which is held yearly at different international locations.
