= Radio Amateurs of Canada =

National association for Amateur Radio in Canada

Radio Amateurs of Canada Radio Amateurs du Canada
- Abbreviation: RAC
- Formation: 1993
- Type: Non-profit organization
- Purpose: Advocacy, Education
- Headquarters: 720 Belfast Road; Suite 217; Ottawa, ON; K1G 0Z5; FN25ej
- Region served: Canada
- Official language: English and French
- President: Allan Boyd, VE3AJB/VE3EM
- Main organ: The Canadian Amateur
- Affiliations: International Amateur Radio Union
- Staff: 2
- Website: www.rac.ca

Radio Amateurs of Canada (RAC), known in French as Radio Amateurs du Canada, is the national non-profit membership association for Amateur Radio in Canada. Its headquarters are located in Ottawa, Ontario, Canada, representing the interests of Amateur Radio all across Canada. Speaking on behalf of Canadian Radio Amateurs, RAC provides liaison with government agencies and carries the Amateur voice about regulatory and spectrum issues to the discussion table with government and industry leaders, nationally and internationally.

RAC is the Canadian voting member society of the International Amateur Radio Union. RAC also provides many services, publications and supplies to its members to enhance their enjoyment of Amateur Radio.

The organization publishes a bimonthly magazine distributed to members called The Canadian Amateur.

== History ==
- 1967 — The Canadian Amateur Radio Federation (CARF) is formed.
- 1979 — The Canadian Radio Relay League (CRRL) is formed from the Canadian Division of the American Radio Relay League.
- 1993 — The Canadian Radio Relay League and Canadian Amateur Radio Federation merge to form Radio Amateurs of Canada, Inc.

== Regulatory advocacy ==
Radio Amateurs of Canada represents all Canadian Amateurs at all levels of government:

1. At the local level it works with municipalities on such issues as regulations governing the placement of antennas. It also assists Amateur Radio clubs and other organizations in Public Service and Emergency Services (ARES) functions throughout the year. RAC also provides assistance to members wishing to install antennas and towers following Industry Canada's (now called Innovation, Science and Economic Development Canada) tower policy including CPC-2-0-03.
2. At the regional/provincial/territorial level it also works with governments on such issues as Distracted Driving Legislation and Emergency Services.
3. At the national level it represents all Amateurs on the Canadian Amateur Radio Advisory Board and works with Innovation, Science and Economic Development Canada on important issues such as tower legislation, RF interference and spectrum grabs by business.
4. At the international level RAC is a member of the International Amateur Radio Union (IARU) which works with the UN’s International Telecommunication Union' ^{[2]} to preserve and expand our frequency spectrum allocations. RAC pays its IARU dues based on the total number of Amateurs in Canada, and not just RAC members so it needs the support of members. RAC also sponsors a representative at the World Radiocommunication Conferences in Geneva, Switzerland to protect existing spectrum and open new spectrum such as the recent allocation at 60 metres at WRC-15. It is expensive to send a representative to Geneva and RAC coordinates the Defence of the Amateur Radio Fund so that Amateurs can contribute to this cost.
5. And beyond...: RAC also supports the Amateur Radio on the International Space Station (ARISS) and provides opportunities for students to experience the thrill of communicating with astronauts on the International Space Station.

The organization also acts as a consultatory body to municipal, provincial, and federal government bodies in matters concerning the Amateur Radio Service.

== Services ==
The Radio Amateurs of Canada offers programs and publications to "promote excellence, the state of the art, and the interests of Amateur Radio's many varied activities".

RAC members have access to services including:

- The Canadian Amateur (TCA) magazine, Canada’s premiere national magazine devoted to Amateur Radio, is published six times per year and is available in both print and digital (eTCA) formats
- The Affiliated Club Program provides documents and other useful material to help local Amateur Radio clubs to be more efficient and provide more useful programs for their members.
- The Affiliated Club Liability Insurance Program provides affordable $5 million liability insurance for RAC-affiliated Amateur Radio clubs and their members.
- The QSL Bureau System distributes reception report (QSL) cards for RAC member to countries around the world
- The Youth Education Program provides support to teachers and schools wishing to implement an Amateur Radio program or project as a way to promote science and technology education.
- The Foundation Program applies member donations to provide financial support through scholarships, research and equipment grants.
- The Field Organization coordinates traffic handling and emergency communications across Canada. Help your community by joining the RAC-sponsored Amateur Radio Emergency Service (ARES) and/or the National Traffic System (NTS).
- The Certified Emergency Coordinator Program provides certificates to ARES Emergency Coordinators who pass a rigorous examination on emergency measures structures and procedures. RAC issues the CEPT and IARP international permits so you can operate your station in many countries without additional permission.
- Two annual contests: the Canada Day Contest on July 1 and the Canada Winter Contest in late December.
- Operating Awards: the Canadaward, Worked All RAC, Canadian Century Club and Worked All North America awards. These are available to all amateurs around the world.
- RAC Canadian Portable Operations Challenge - This challenge was created to promote portable radio operations by Canadian amateurs in Canada, and is only open to RAC members. There are monthly and yearly winners who receive certificates for their achievement. This program also offers the Coureur des Bois award which is earned after having submitted a certain number of activation reports to the Challenge.
- The club website has Amateur Radio news, info, call sign directory, antenna programs and links to other resources.

The Radio Amateur of Canada offers programs and publications to "promote excellence, the state of the art, and the interests of Amateur Radio's many varied activities". The RAC maintains a Field Organization for public service. Radio Amateurs of Canada also has a Youth Education Program to encourage use of amateur radio in schools across Canada, as a way to promote science and technology education. RAC offers technical and some financial assistance through this program.

=== Emergency services ===
Canadian Amateur Radio operators also provide emergency communications through the RAC Auxiliary Communications Service organized by the Radio Amateurs of Canada. RAC has an understanding with the Canadian Red Cross Society to assist with communications in the event of an emergency or disaster.

== See also ==
- Amateur radio call-signs of Canada
- American Radio Relay League
