= Global Amateur Radio Emergency Communications Conference =

The GAREC logo.

The Global Amateur Radio Emergency Communications Conference or GAREC was a conference held annually from 2005–2014 by the International Amateur Radio Union for discussion of amateur radio operation during natural disasters and other emergencies with the motto, "Saving lives through emergency communications". GAREC was first held in Tampere, Finland in 2005, coinciding with the adoption of the Tampere Convention, a globally binding emergency communications treaty that had been signed in Tampere in 1998. In later conferences, the venue has attempted to rotate in sequence through ITU Regions 1, 2 and 3 (though not necessarily in that order).

== Subsequent conferences ==
| Year | Location | Dates | Notes |
|---|---|---|---|
| GAREC-2006 | Tampere, Finland (IARU Region 1) | 19–20 June | Held in conjunction with the International Conference on Emergency Communications, ICEC-2006, which reviewed the status of implementation and application of the Tampere Convention. |
| GAREC-2007 | Huntsville, Alabama (IARU Region 2) | 16–17 August | Held in conjunction with the Huntsville Hamfest and the ARRL's yearly convention. |
| GAREC-2008 | Friedrichshafen, Germany (IARU Region 1) | 26–27 June | Held in conjunction with the 33rd annual HamRadio exhibition. |
| GAREC-2009 | Tokyo, Japan (IARU Region 3) | 24–25 August | Theme: "Emergency Communications across Borders". Held in conjunction with the Japan Amateur Radio League's JARL Ham Fair. |
| GAREC-2010 | Willemstad, Curaçao, Netherlands Antilles (IARU Region 2) | 11–12 October | Theme: "Learning through Practicing" |
| GAREC-2011 | Sun City, South Africa (IARU Region 1) | 15–19 August | Theme: "Building Partnerships". Held as part of the IARU Region 1 Conference. |
| GAREC-2012 | Port Dickson, Malaysia (IARU Region 3) | 11–15 November | Also known as "MyGAREC 2012" |
| GAREC-2013 | Zurich, Switzerland (IARU Region 1) | 25–28 June | Held in conjunction with the HAM RADIO exhibition in Friedrichshafen. |
| GAREC-2014 | Huntsville, Alabama (IARU Region 2) | 14–15 August | Held at the Embassy Suites Hotel, Huntsville Alabama, United States 35801. |
| GAREC-2015 | Tampere, Finland (IARU Region 1) | 23–24 June | Event was cancelled in April 2015 |

It seems 2014 was the last conference held successfully.
