= New Zealand Association of Radio Transmitters =

Non-profit organisation of amateur radio enthusiasts in New Zealand

- Abbreviation: NZART
- Formation: 16 August 1926
- Type: Non-profit organisation
- Purpose: Advocacy, Education, Non-Profit
- Headquarters: Upper Hutt; RE78mv
- Region served: New Zealand
- President: Warren Harris ZL2AJ
- Main organ: Council
- Affiliations: International Amateur Radio Union
- Website: https://www.nzart.org.nz/

The New Zealand Association of Radio Transmitters (NZART) is a non-profit organisation of amateur radio enthusiasts in New Zealand. It represents New Zealand amateur radio operators nationally and internationally. NZART is a founding member of the International Amateur Radio Union. It is an association of individual members, however those members are encouraged to form local branches.

Membership of NZART is voluntary; it is estimated that approximately 35% of New Zealand's licensed amateur radio operators belong. Members are represented by Councillors to the NZART Council, the executive body tasked with the business management of the association.

== Governance ==
The NZART Council includes seven executives. These are the NZART President, vice-president, and Immediate Past President (if required). Regional councillors are elected to represent different geographic regions of New Zealand: two from the North Island, two from the South Island, and two from anyway within New Zealand.

The NZART Council works with an appointed NZART Business Manager. The Business Manager is employed by NZART (30 hrs per week), and in 2020 an Office Assistant was employed (30 hrs per week). Both are tasked with the day-to-day business operations of the association, including manning their office, and providing administrative duties to AREC, located in Upper Hutt, near Wellington.

Additional officers reporting directly to NZART Council include the Chief Executive Officer (CEO) Amateur Radio Emergency Communications, The Engineering Licensing Group (ELG) and the Administration Liaison Officer (ALO), who is charged with liaison with the Radio Spectrum Management Group of the New Zealand Ministry of Business, Innovation and Employment (MBIE).

== Relations with the New Zealand Government ==
The NZART has performed an advocacy function, commenting on policy and planning initiatives proposed by the New Zealand government in the areas of radio licences, spectrum allocations for broadband wireless, and the future of digital communication. The Association also contributed to the creation of EMF exposure standards in their role as member of the NZ RF Standard Committee.

In 2006, the Ministry of Economic Development's Radio Spectrum Management division was assisted by NZART and the local Coastguard Boating Education Service in the creation of an update to the Spectrum Management and Registration Technology (SMART) which allowed people to search online for radio operator information including callsigns. In 2008, it was noted that there were some discrepancies between the SMART system and the callsign book produced by NZART.

== Publications and services ==
The official journal of the NZART is ''Break-In'', a bi-monthly publication containing articles of interest to the amateur radio community. Also, an annual publication known as the Call Book provides an index of licensed amateurs in New Zealand by call sign, providing addresses for the purpose of contact acknowledgement (QSL), as well as much other information useful to the New Zealand radio enthusiast. Other publications include Ham Shacks, Brass Pounders and Rag Chewers, a history of amateur radio in New Zealand, published in 1997 with assistance from the New Zealand Department of Internal Affairs Historical Branch.

In 1980, NZART collaborated with author Jumbo Godfrey ZL1HV to produce a Basic radio training manual: a study course for the amateur radio operators.

The Association provides some educational services, such as providing demonstrative lectures on electromagnetic wave theory. Another service offered by the Association is to provide trained personnel and radio communications systems to Amateur Radio Emergency Communications, a group which liaises with the New Zealand Police and Civil Defense services in emergency situations.

=== Break-In ===
The official journal of the NZART is ''Break-In'', and is published bimonthly. The publication is a requirement of the NZART Constitution The term break-in refers to a system in CW whereby the transmitting station can hear the other station's signal during “key up” periods.

A total of six issues a year are produced, with the first January/February distributed within the first week of February, and so on.

The close off dates for articles/advertising are year-on-year:

10 January for January/February issue.
10 March for March/April issue.
20 April for May/June issue. (produced to coincide with the AGM over Kings Birthday Weekend)
10 July for July/August issue.
10 September for September/October issue.
10 November for November/December issue.

Each issue normally contains Technical and General articles of interest to amateur radio operators. Sometimes the articles are of a more general nature with some flavour of radio mixed into the article.

In addition, each issue contains a number of columns from various authors covering activities from AREC, Contests, Digitalmodes, DX, Satellites, SOTA, Youth Report and more.

As the official journal Break-In contains information about the association, as well as news and announcements, AGM news and Remits plus the Annual Accounts. As a magazine it has varied information with many members having copies going back to the very first issue produced in January 1928.

=== Call Book ===
Call Book is annual publication that provides an index of all licensed amateurs in New Zealand by call sign, providing addresses for the purpose of contact acknowledgement (QSL), as well as much other information useful to the New Zealand radio enthusiast, such as a series of Repeater/Beacon Maps for both VHF and UHF repeaters based around New Zealand. This eighty page stapled publication is included free with membership of NZART, bundled with the November–December issue of Break-In. Although produced as a paper publication, electronic versions have also been produced on CD-ROM, with the last version produced in this format in 2017. The membership decide each year at the AGM on the format to be produced.

== Branches ==
Branches of NZART are generally radio clubs and related organisations, and are found across the country. The Branches facilitate the representation of individual members at a national level through the NZART National Conference. Most radio clubs are individually incorporated and operate on a day-to-day basis independently of the NZART. The number following the branch name is their NZART branch number.

Numerous branches experienced membership decline (possibly proportionate to a national decline), and have been reduced to a status of "recess" for several years.

== History ==
The New Zealand Association of Radio Transmitters formed on 16 August 1926. In the same year, Gordon Smithson (Z1AF) made the first NZART broadcast. The first publication of Break-in, the NZART journal, was in 1928. In 1929 NZART became a more powerful organisation, joining the International Amateur Radio Union and successfully lobbying the New Zealand Government for a reduction in the compulsory licensing fees.

In 1934 the Association became an incorporated society and in 1982 their membership numbers reached a high of 4,397. The first NZART written submission to the New Zealand government was in 1989 and related to the proposed Radiocommunications Bill. In 1998 the Association established the Radioscience Education Trust. NZART is registered as a charity in 2017.

=== Presidential Terms ===
Forty six radio amateurs have led NZART as president.

Name	Call Sign	Years	Name	Call Sign	Years	Name	Call Sign	Years
W K Harris	ZL2AJ	2026-	R T Woodfield	ZL2VN	1962-1964	H P V Brown	ZL3CG	1931
D R Vandenberg	ZL2DRV	2023-2026	G McB Salt	ZL1CK	1960-1962	T R Clarkson	ZL1FQ	1930
M S Gooding	ZL2UFI	2019-2023	J F Freeman	ZL1VA	1958-1960	R J Orbell	ZL1AX	1929
S J Watchman	ZL2TW	2015-2019	H F Arnold	ZL3HA	1955-1958	R J Orbell	OZ1AX	1928
V N Henderson	ZL1TGC	2012-2015	R H Hanley	ZL2GU	1953-1955	E A Shrimpton	Z2XA	1926-1927
D R Symon	ZL2KH	2009-2012	W J Wainwright	ZL3LI	1951-1953			
W L B Douglas	ZL2WP	2005-2009	C T Berry	ZL2BY	1950-1951			
A P Norden	ZL2SJ	2001-2005	J F Freeman	ZL2AFB	1949-1950			
A J Wallace	ZL1AMW	1997-2001	C G Liddell	ZL2BI	1947-1949			
J A Meachen	ZL2BHF	1992-1997	E B Lough	ZL2OG	1945-1946			
T C King	ZL2AKW	1991-1992	C G Liddell	ZL2BI	1943-1944			
T D Carrell	ZL3QL	1985-1991	W Fouhy	ZL2LB	1941-1942			
D J MacKay	ZL3RW	1983-1985	B E Jackson	ZL2FJ	1940			
A G Godfrey	ZL1HV	1977-1983	F W Sellens	ZL2MY	1939			
W D Gorman MBE	ZL2IY	1974-1977	L G Petrie	ZL2OV	1938			
J F C Johnson	ZL2AMJ	1973-1974	R B Dodds	ZL4FK	1937			
D E Cleland	ZL1IY	1972-1973	W M Hall	ZL2BH	1936			
D A Lloyd	ZL4PG	1970-1972	C N Edwards	ZL1AA	1935			
W R Hamer	ZL2CD	1969-1970	W G Collett	ZL4BP	1934			
H Burton	ZL2APC	1966-1969	N W Laugesen	ZL3AS	1933			
C G Liddell	ZL3ND	1964-1966	D Wilkinson	ZL2AB	1932			

== See also ==
- Amateur radio call signs of New Zealand
