= DARES =

Dutch Amateur Radio Emergency Service
- Abbreviation: DARES
- Founded: 12 May 2004
- Type: Non-profit organization
- Purpose: Emergency response
- Region served: Netherlands
- Official language: Dutch, English
- Affiliations: VERON, ANBI
- Staff: ~300
- Website: http://www.dares.nl

The Dutch Amateur Radio Emergency Service (DARES), which was founded on 12 May 2004, is a non-profit organization made out of licensed radio amateurs in the Netherlands. DARES participants are able to set up a national, continental or international radio network in case of an emergency situation, like a power outage on a large scale, a flooding, a cyber attack causing severe damage to communication networks, or other emergency situations, where the safety of a large group of people are in danger.

== Regions ==
The DARES board (consisting of a few persons) has assigned 25 Safety regions, which are also used by other emergency services in the Netherlands:

- NNL - North Netherlands (R1, R2, R3, R4) - Groningen, Friesland, Drenthe, Northwest Overijssel
- R5 - Safety region Twente
- R6 - Safety region North and East-Gelderland
- R7 - Safety region Central Gelderland
- R8 - Safety region South Gelderland
- R9 - Safety region Utrecht
- R10 - Safety region North North Holland
- R11 - Safety region Zaanstreek-Waterland
- R12 - Safety region Kennemerland
- R13 - Safety region Amsterdam-Amstelland
- R14 - Safety region Gooi en Vechtstreek (now R25)
- R15 - Safety region Haaglanden
- R16 - Safety region Holland Center (now R15)
- R17 - Safety region Rotterdam-Rijnmond
- R18 - Safety region Zuid-Holland-Zuid
- R19 - Safety region Zeeland
- R20 - Safety region Central and West Brabant
- R21 - Safety region Brabant North
- R22 - Safety region Brabant Southeast
- R23 - Safety region North Limburg
- R24 - Safety region South Limburg
- R25 - Safety region Flevoland

Every region has its own Region Coordinator (RC), which keeps their region trained.

== See also ==
- Amateur radio
- Amateur Radio Emergency Service
- Emergency communication
