= Radio Amateurs Emergency Network =

British voluntary communications service

Radio Amateurs' Emergency Network
- Abbreviation: RAYNET
- Formation: 1953
- Type: Non-profit organization
- Purpose: Amateur radio emergency communications
- Region served: UK
- President: Cathy Clark G1GQJ
- Main organ: Committee of Management
- Website: https://www.raynet-uk.net

The Radio Amateurs' Emergency Network, also known as RAYNET, is a British national voluntary communications service provided by amateur radio operators. It was formed in 1953 and exists to supplement national communication channels in the event of an emergency. The capitalised word RAYNET is now a registered trademark of the RAYNET-UK organisation.

== History ==
The idea of RAYNET came into being in the aftermath of the North Sea flood of 1953, a natural disaster that damaged the communication cables along the east coast of England on the night of 31 January 1953. With communication lines crippled, the police authorities, in desperation, sought help from the few amateur radio operators then licensed, and, although illegal at that time, the Home Office permitted the use of amateur radios to direct and co-ordinate the rescue teams. The following year, an infant network first known as RAEN was formed. The Home Office conceded the desirability of an organisation which, in times of emergency, could effect the passing of messages facilitating the rescue operations of the professional services, who themselves lacked the 'instant communications' of radio at the time. While RAEN began on a minor scale with only a few operators involved, the network has grown into a nationwide movement now known as "RAYNET".

== See also ==
- Amateur radio emergency communications
- Similar organizations in the US, Amateur Radio Emergency Service, Radio Amateur Civil Emergency Service in Australia WICEN: https://wicen.org.au/
