= Military Auxiliary Radio System =

United States civilian auxiliary service for military support

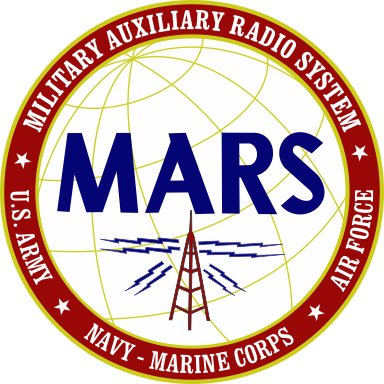
- Abbreviation: MARS
- Formation: November 1925; 101 years ago
- Purpose: To provide contingency communications support for the United States Department of Defense and Military Services
- Region served: Worldwide

The Military Auxiliary Radio System (MARS) is a United States Department of Defense sponsored program, established as a separately managed and operated program by the United States Army and the United States Air Force. The United States Navy-Marine Corps program closed in 2015. The program is a civilian auxiliary consisting primarily of licensed amateur radio operators who are interested in assisting the military with communications on a regional and national level when access to traditional forms of communication may no longer be available. The MARS programs also include active duty, reserve, and National Guard units; and Navy, Marine Corps units.

MARS has a long history of providing worldwide auxiliary emergency communications during times of need. The combined two-service MARS programs (Army, and Air Force), have a volunteer force of over 3,000 radio operators who are the backbone of the MARS program. The MARS membership is meant to let people experience the radio hobby's service to the nation. MARS members work by the slogans "Proudly Serving Those Who Serve" and "Proud, Professional, and Ready."

== History ==
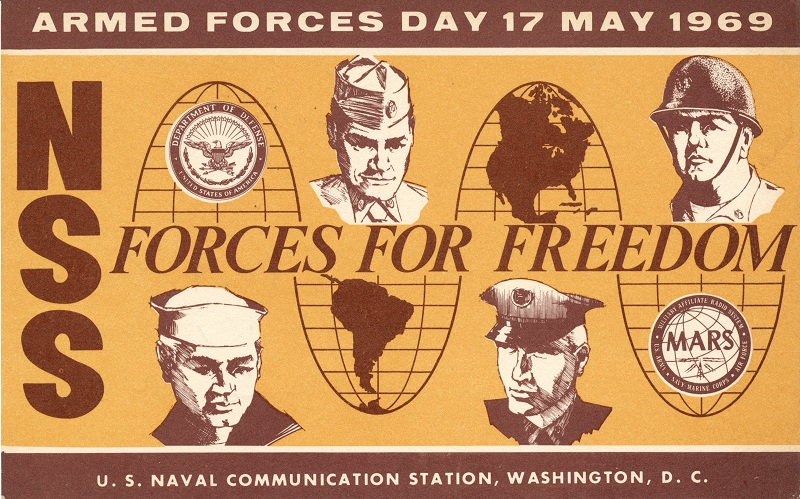
QSL card sent by US Navy MARS station NSS for a cross-band radio contact with W2LV on Armed Forces Day 1969

The organization that led to the Military Auxiliary Radio System was called the Auxiliary Amateur Radio System (AARS). AARS was created in November 1925 by a few dedicated pioneers in the United States Army Signal Corps led by Captain Thomas C. Rives. The United States recognized radio as a critical mode of communication during World War I. The integration of radio to support Army operations generated a significant manpower and skill requirement that was not easily met. The Army Amateur Radio System was formed in 1925 to provide a pool of trained radio operators to augment the Signal Corps during mobilization in time of war and provide an extension of the Signal Corps' radio network to support civil authority with natural disaster relief efforts. While supporting military goals, the organization was composed of volunteer civilians who were accomplished radio amateurs. These civilians applied their specialty skills in radio communication while supporting the Signal Corps across the continental United States, the Philippines, Panama, and Hawaii.

The organization ultimately experienced both success and failure. The Army Amateur Radio System succeeded in developing the proficiency of its radio operators as demonstrated by the support provided to local, state, and federal authorities during natural disaster relief efforts. However, on the eve of the United States' entry into World War II, the Army Amateur Radio System's membership was significantly underdeveloped in numbers to provide significant manpower to augment the Signal Corps' mobilization for war. The AARS organization continued to operate until the United States entry into World War II on 7 December 1941, at which time radio amateurs were denied the use of the airwaves, and the amateur service and the Army Amateur Radio System were deactivated. Following WWII, the US Army recognized the importance of reactivating the AARS to train vitally needed communications personnel at a relatively low direct cost to the government, and in 1946 the AARS was reactivated.

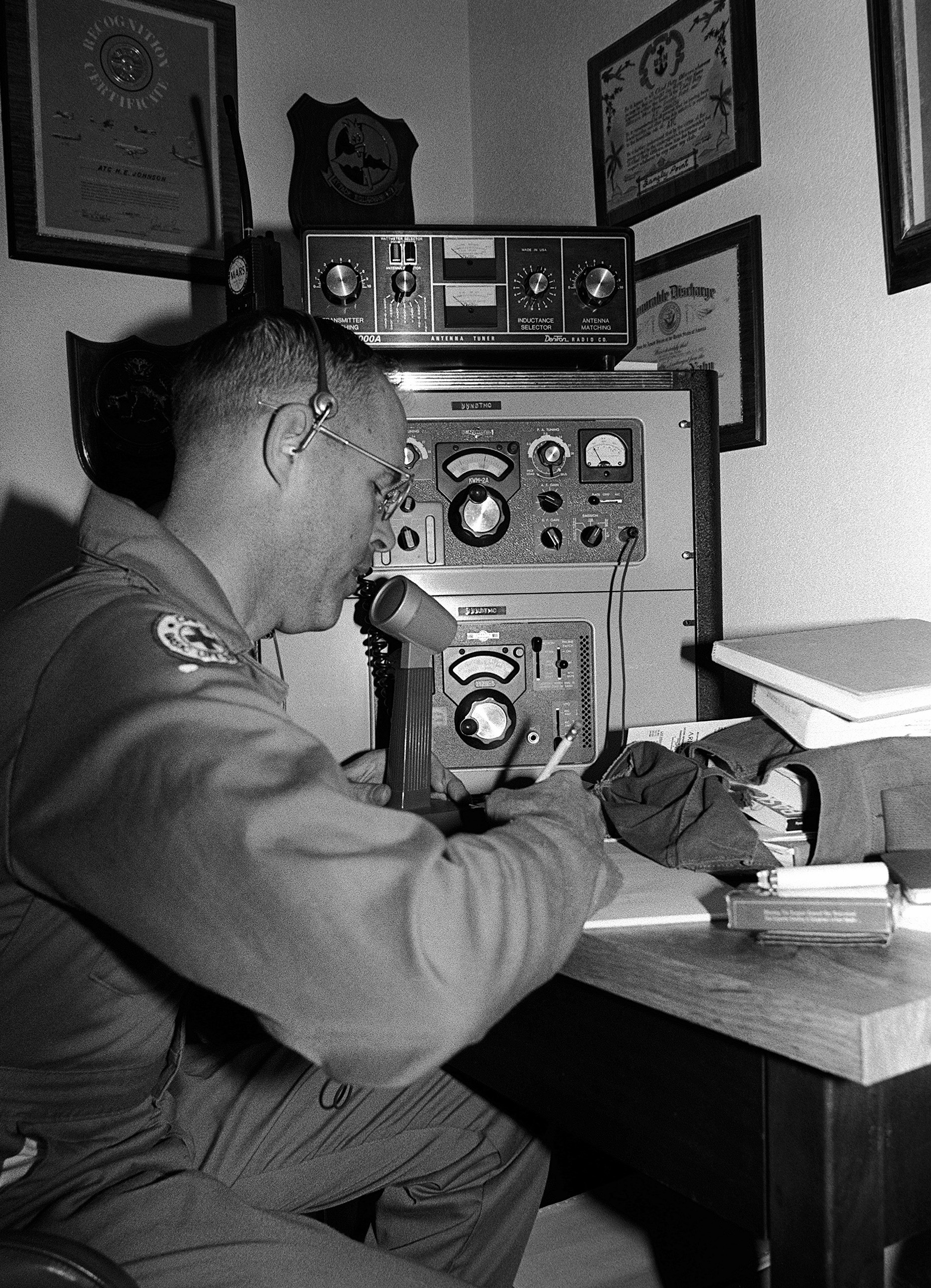
MARS Operator at Marine Corps Logistics Base Albany, 1983.

The AARS functioned as such until the creation of the Military Affiliate Radio System in November 1948 with the establishment of separate Army and Air Force MARS programs, reflecting the creation of the Air Force as a separate service. In 1948 Captain Robert L. Gabardy (K4TJ) selected the use of the acronym MARS, the Roman god of war, as a fitting name for the post-World War II rebirth of the AARS as the Military Amateur Radio System. The program's name was changed to the Military Affiliate Radio System on 2 September 1952, in recognition of the organization's changing nature with the growing number of civilian volunteer members. Eventually, the Navy-Marine Corps MARS program was established officially on 17 August 1962, and began operations on 1 January 1963. This followed the Cuban Missile Crisis and President Kennedy's concern for viable and extended communications capabilities.

During the Korean War, Vietnam War, Cold War and Gulf War, MARS was most known for its handling of "Marsgram" written messages and providing "phone patches" to allow overseas servicemen to contact their families at home.

The program's name was changed again to the current Military Auxiliary Radio System on 23 December 2009.

A dispatch issued in May 2009 announced the shutdown of the Navy and Marine Corps MARS program by September 30, 2009. However, Navy-Marine Corps MARS continued to function until September 30, 2015.

Department of Defense Instruction 4650.02, dated 23 December 2009 changed the status of MARS from an affiliate to an auxiliary (equal in status to the Coast Guard Auxiliary and Civil Air Patrol). This change in status saved the Navy-Marine Corps MARS program from being shut down and put it back in line with the Emergency Communications mission of its sister services (Army and Air Force MARS).

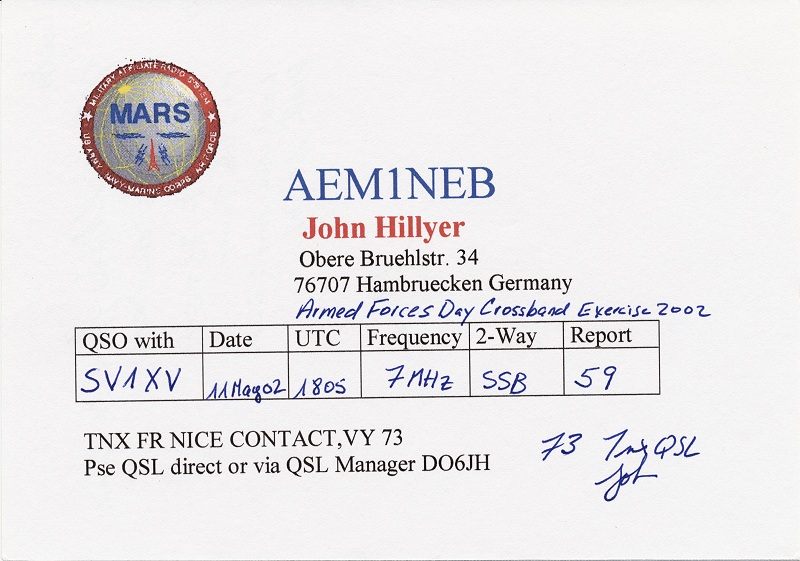
QSL card from MARS station AEM1NEB

== Missions ==
Military Auxiliary Radio System provides Department of Defense sponsored emergency communications on a local, national, and international basis. MARS also provides auxiliary communications for military entities only. One major mission that MARS has had for many years is to handle morale, welfare, and official record and voice communications traffic for Armed Forces and authorized U.S. Government civilian personnel stationed throughout the world. MARS establishes programs to create civilian interest, recruit qualified volunteers, and furnish training in military communications, techniques, and procedures.

Every year, MARS conducts an appropriate military and amateur radio cross-band exercise as an integral part of the annual Armed Forces Day. They provide a reserve of personnel trained in military radio communications, techniques, and procedures as well as to initiate efforts to improve radio-operating techniques. MARS members test state-of-the-art technology through experimentation and testing.

== Armed Forces Day Crossband Test ==
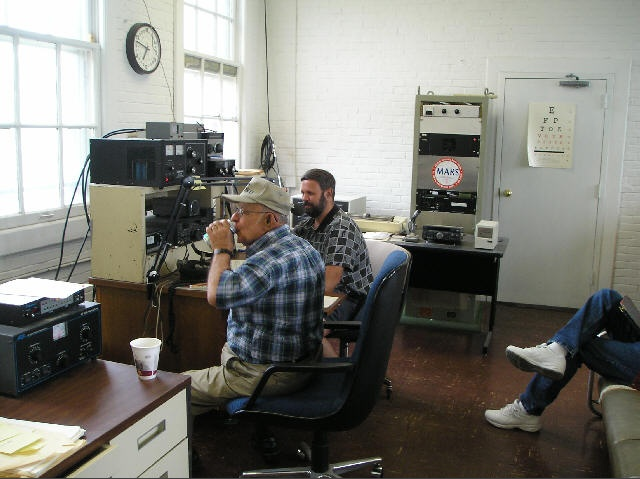
Navy-Marine Corps MARS station, NAV-4, operating on Armed Forces Day

MARS celebrates Armed Forces Day annually with a traditional military to amateur crossband communications test and a message-receiving test. These tests give amateur radio operators and shortwave listeners an opportunity to demonstrate their individual technical skills and receive recognition from the Secretary of Defense or the appropriate military radio station for their proven expertise. A QSL card is provided to those making contact with one of the military stations. Special commemorative certificates are awarded to anyone who receives and accurately copies the digital Armed Forces Day message from the Secretary of Defense.

Participating military stations transmit on selected military MARS frequencies and listen for amateur radio stations in the amateur bands. The military station operator will announce the specific amateur-band frequency being monitored. Usually, MARS stations are located in military and government installations such as The Pentagon, Fort Huachuca, Andrews Air Force Base, Nellis Air Force Base, as well as Navy bases such as NAS Whidbey Island and several Coast Guard locations.

== Today ==
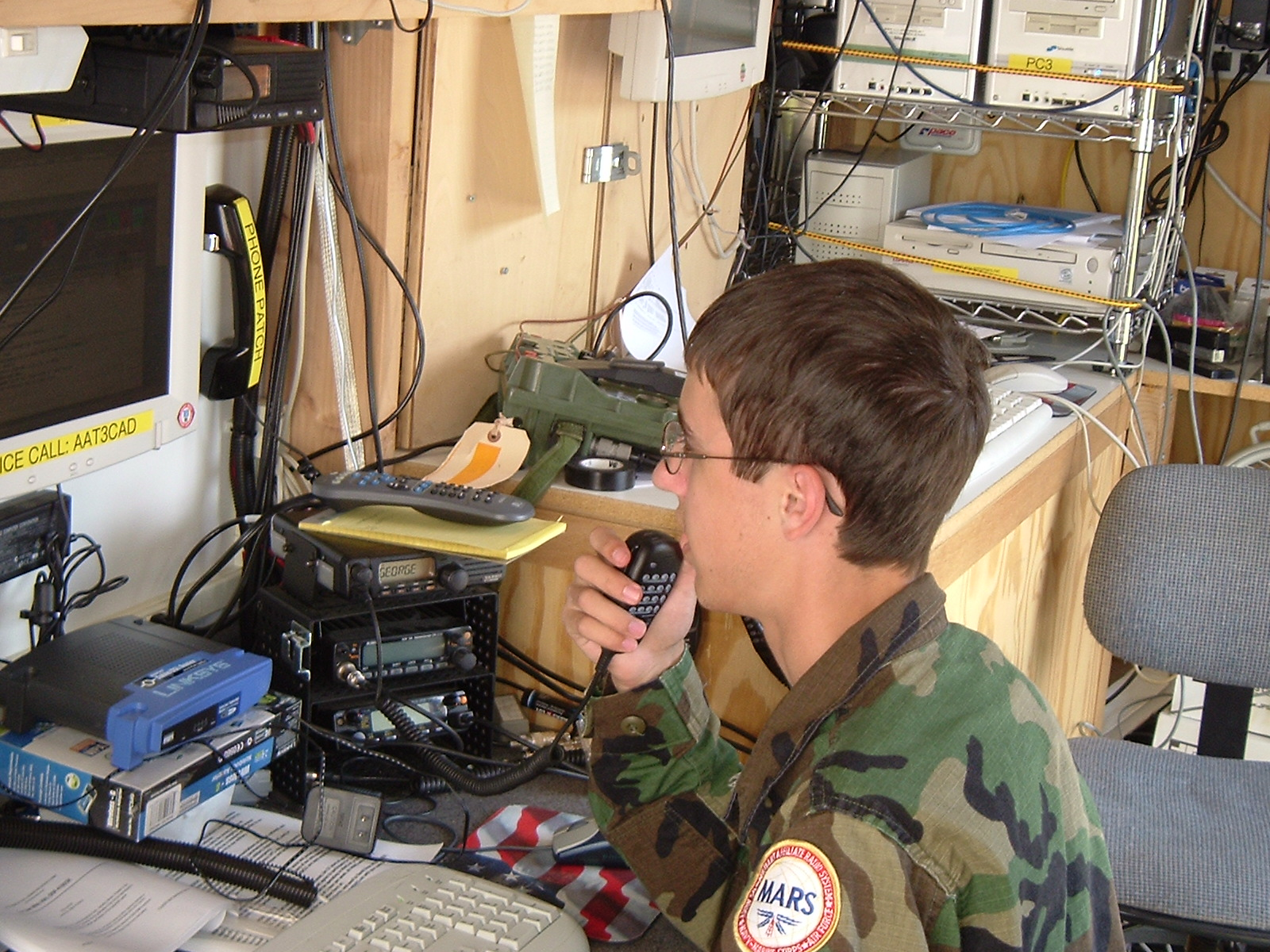
MARS Operator using a radio to communicate with the U.S. Army Reserve in the MARS Emergency Communications Unit trailer

The Military Auxiliary Radio System continues to be active today. Its primary mission is to provide contingency communications to the Department of Defense and Military Services.

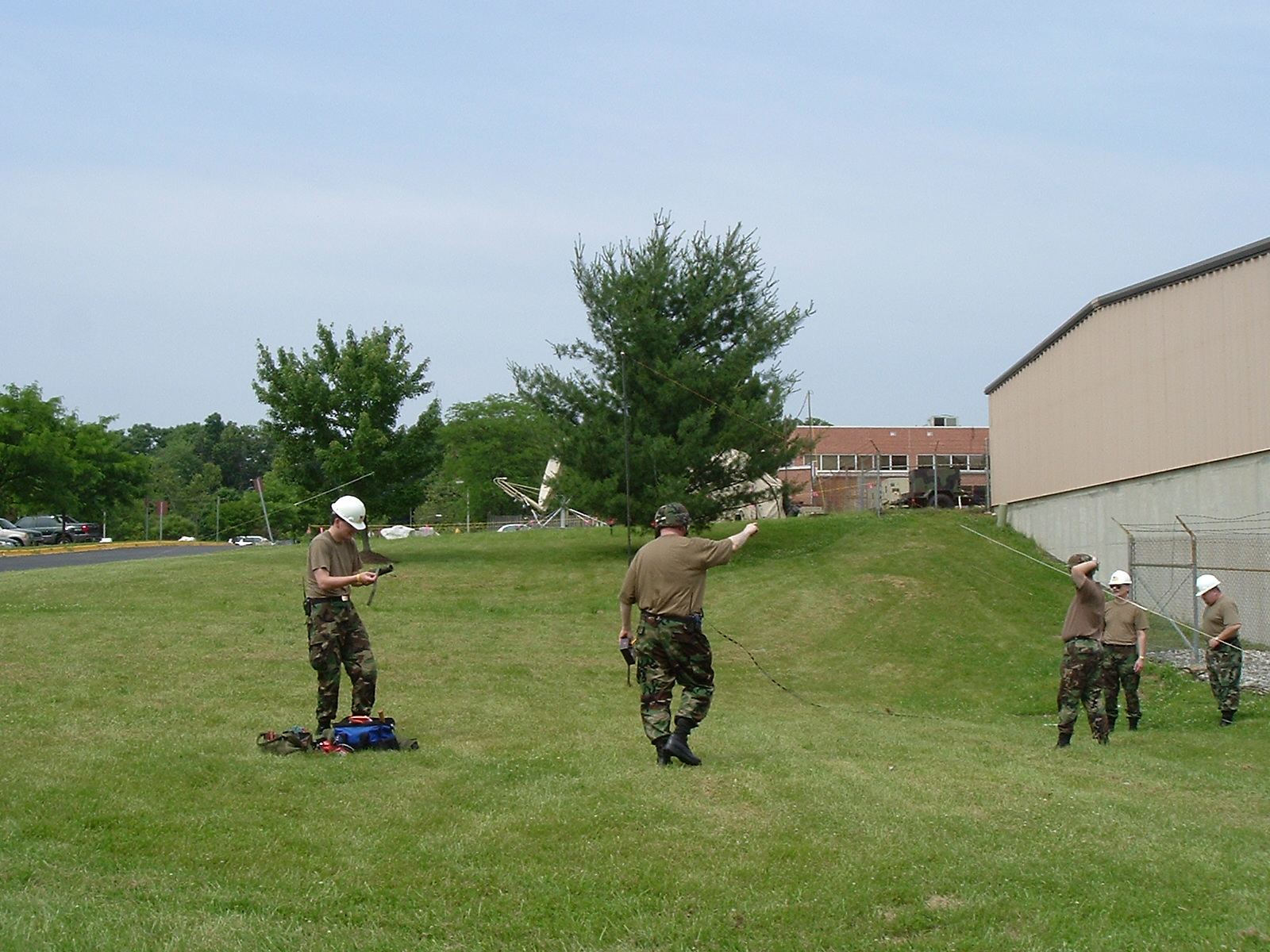
MARS Operators erecting an HF antenna at Fort Meade for Grecian Firebolt 2005.

MARS participates in exercises such as QRPX, JulyX Skills Challenge, and Bold Quest to help support military communicators practice HF radio skills. MARS interfaces with Amateur Radio and provides DoD with local, domestic information when normal methods of communications are impaired or disrupted.

The traditional land or sea-based MARS Radio Phone Patch is largely a thing of the past because land and sea-based MARS stations have been dismantled in favor of Satellite Phones. However, modern military aircraft are still equipped with HF radios, and many military aircrews still use MARS Phone Patches as a backup or substitute to Satellite Communications. The USAF MARS Phone Patch Net provides 24/7 HF Radio Phone Patch service to all branches of United States military aircraft worldwide.

== Customers ==
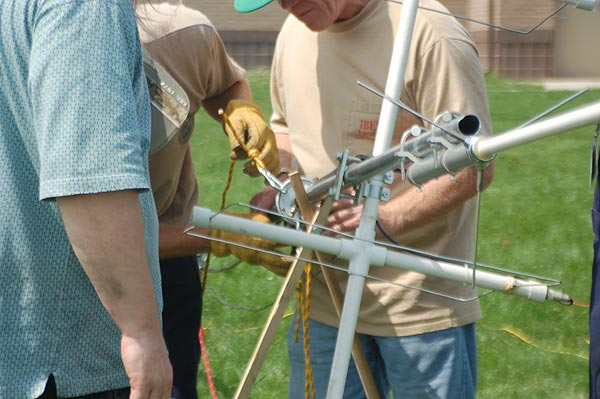
Members of the then Military Affiliate Radio System (MARS) prep an antenna on 10 May 2007 as they respond to a simulated nuclear incident during Operation Vigilant Guard, a joint military and civilian training exercise under way at Camp Atterbury, near Edinburgh, Indiana

- Department of Defense
  - Department of the Army
  - Department of the Air Force
- Department of Homeland Security
  - United States Coast Guard
  - Transportation Security Administration (TSA)
  - Federal Emergency Management Agency (FEMA)
  - National Communications System (NCS) (Former)
  - National Disaster Medical System (NDMS)
- Department of State

== Termination of Navy MARS operations ==
Effective September 30, 2015, Navy MARS no longer operates. The US Navy, after completing a study, found that NAVY MARS provided no useful purpose to their missions. Even so, some MARS stations that work in concert with the Air Force are still located at U.S. Naval installations.

== See also ==
- Civil Air Patrol
- Canadian Forces Affiliate Radio System
- Mount Weather Emergency Operations Center
