= Quarter Century Wireless Association =

American organization of amateur radio enthusiasts

Quarter Century Wireless Association Inc
- Abbreviation: QCWA
- Formation: December 5, 1947
- Type: Non-profit organization
- Legal status: 501(c)(3) organization
- Purpose: Amateur radio; charitable, educational, and scientific activities
- Headquarters: Lawrenceville, Georgia, United States
- Region served: Worldwide
- Members: 3,281
- Official language: English
- President: Anthony Perales, AI1U
- Website: qcwa.org

The Quarter Century Wireless Association, Inc. (QCWA) is a nonprofit organization with members worldwide for licensed amateur radio operators who were first licensed at least 25 years earlier and who currently hold an amateur radio license. Continuous licensing during the intervening 25 years is not required. QCWA was founded in 1947 and promotes friendship and cooperation among experienced amateur radio operators as well as charitable, educational, and scientific activities related to amateur radio.

== History ==
QCWA was founded in 1947 for amateur radio operators who had been licensed for at least 25 years. Local chapters began to be established in 1951, with the Cleveland, Ohio, chapter becoming the first chartered chapter. At the time of QCWA’s 75th anniversary in 2022, ARRL reported that the association had 230 chapters in the United States and had enrolled nearly 40,000 members during its history.

In 2002, ARRL reported that QCWA had nearly 200 active chapters and more than 10,000 active members worldwide. CQ Amateur Radio also marked QCWA’s 75th anniversary, describing its 1947 formation, membership requirements, mentoring activities, and scholarship program.

== Membership and activities ==
Membership is available to amateur radio operators who were first licensed at least 25 years earlier and who currently hold a valid amateur radio license. Continuous licensing throughout that period is not required. QCWA reports that 39,580 membership numbers have been assigned since 1947 and that its current active membership is approximately 3,281. Although most members are located in the United States, membership extends worldwide.

QCWA activities include local chapter participation, conventions, and amateur radio operating events such as QSO parties and special-event stations.

== Anniversary activties ==
In connection with its 70th anniversary in 2017, QCWA organized an 11-day charity cruise. ARRL reported that the organization had received permission to conduct amateur radio operations aboard the ship using the QCWA call sign W2MM.

For its 75th anniversary in 2022, QCWA operated the special-event station W2MM from December 3 through December 10 and organized the members-only Worked 75/75 Members Contest, which ran from December 5, 2022, through February 18, 2023.

== Scholarship program ==
QCWA established its scholarship program in 1977, and its first scholarship, valued at $500, was awarded in 1978. The program is administered in partnership with the ARRL Foundation and provides scholarships to licensed amateur radio operators attending accredited colleges or universities.

QCWA reported that through 2024, more than 624 students had received scholarships totaling more than $930,350. Fifteen scholarships totaling $57,000 were awarded in 2024.

== Relationships with other organizations ==
QCWA has maintained cooperative relationships with other amateur radio and wireless organizations. The American Radio Relay League and QCWA first entered into a cooperative agreement in 1984, and the agreement was updated and reaffirmed in May 2009.

The Radio Club of America identifies QCWA as one of its partner organizations and describes it as a worldwide association of radio amateurs formed in 1947.

== Historical coverage ==
QCWA received coverage in amateur radio publications shortly after its formation. In 1948, both QST and CQ Amateur Radio reported on the association during its first year of activity.

References to QCWA continued to appear in amateur-radio and electronics publications over subsequent decades, including QST in 1950, Radio-Electronics in 1952, the RSGB Bulletin in 1961, Robert Hertzberg's 1968 book So You Want to Be a Ham, Popular Electronics in 1980, and Radiosporting in 1986.

A 1977 editorial in 73 Magazine provided more extensive discussion of QCWA and its activities within the amateur-radio community.
