= NetHope =

Global consortium of nonprofit organizations

- Founded: 2001
- Founder: Edward G. Happ and Dipak Basu
- Type: Non-governmental organization
- Location: McLean, Virginia, US
- Region served: 180 countries
- Method: NetHope empowers committed nonprofit organizations to change the world through the power of technology. By facilitating collaboration between NetHope's nonprofit members, charitable foundations and tech sponsors, NetHope is a catalyst for productive innovation and problem-solving in humanitarian and conservation work. Since its founding in 2001, NetHope has grown to represent nearly 60 top tier international NGOs, working on some of the world's toughest challenges including poverty and hunger, refugee displacement, human trafficking, gender inequality, and environmental protection in 180 countries worldwide.
- Key people: Lance Pierce (Executive Director); Farhan Irshad (Chairman)
- Revenue: US$9.25 million (2009)
- Employees: 33
- Website: nethope.org

NetHope, Inc. is a global consortium of nearly 60 global nonprofit organizations that specializes in improving IT connectivity among humanitarian organizations in countries of the Global South and areas affected by disaster. The organization has partnerships with Accenture, Amazon, Cisco, Facebook, Google, Microsoft, Oracle NetSuite and more than 60 leading technology companies. Its humanitarian development, emergency response, and conservation programs are in place in 180 countries. It was founded in 2001.

== Founding ==
In March 2001, Edward G. Happ, then CIO of Save the Children, authored a paper entitled "Wiring the Global Village" that discussed two hypotheses: Edward G. Happ is an author and consultant who works with nonprofits. He was an Executive Fellow at the University of Michigan School of Information for 5 years until he retired recently. Before that, he had important positions in information technology, such as:

1. Global Chief Information Officer of the International Red Cross and Red Crescent Societies in Geneva, Switzerland.

2. Chief Information Officer of Save the Children in Westport, Connecticut.

He specializes in using technology to achieve organizational goals, and he has been involved in many initiatives and projects in the nonprofit sector. You can learn more about him on his website, where he posts his insights, stories, and reflections from his career.

1. International nonprofits could solve the connection problem better, faster, and cheaper if done together rather than reinventing the wheel as individual organizations; and
2. Nonprofits would be in a better position to partner with corporate sponsors as a group rather than as individuals.

This paper was presented to Cisco's corporate philanthropy group and became the basis for NetHope. Soon, Cisco fellow Dipak Basu coined the name "NetHope".

== Work ==
Former Winrock employee Gary Garriott showing Wounaan Indians the Internet for the first time in their community in Panama

=== Places of operation ===
NetHope members operate in over 180 countries around the world. NetHope also operates four chapters in the following areas: Africa, Asia, Europe and North America. NetHope is based in McLean, Virginia, but operates with staff in North America, Europe, and Africa.

=== NetReliefKit ===
Working with Cisco Systems and British satellite firm Inmarsat, NetHope developed the NetReliefKit, which is a solar powered wireless router that can connect users to the Internet via a satellite uplink. They were distributed for use with nonprofit organizations such as Save the Children, Catholic Relief Services, Oxfam, and Mercy Corps. The kits are meant to be used for relief agencies to coordinate their response efforts. The device was deployed to provide Internet connectivity after the 2004 Indian Ocean earthquake.

=== Member organizations ===
NetHope Member Organizations
Year added	Organizations
2001	Save the Children, World Vision, CARE, Mercy Corps, Catholic Relief Services, Winrock International, Children International
2002	Oxfam, Plan International
2003	Christian Children's Fund
2004	ActionAid, The Nature Conservancy, Relief International, International Rescue Committee
2005	Heifer International, Wildlife Conservation Society, Save the Children - UK (Federated Member)
2006	Concern Worldwide
2007	American Red Cross (Federated Member), International Federation of Red Cross and Red Crescent Societies, WaterAid
2008	Ashoka, PATH, Christian Aid, VSO
2009	ACCION, FINCA, Canadian Red Cross (Federated Member)
2010	SOS Children's Villages, Habitat for Humanity, Pact
2011	Compassion International, Conservation International
2012	World Wildlife Fund (WWF), Americares, Trocaire
2013	Direct Relief, International Medical Corps, Islamic Relief Worldwide, Women for Women International
2014	Samaritan's Purse, Ipas
2015	Norwegian Refugee Council
2016	Danish Refugee Council, ProMujer, HIAS, Deutsche Welthungerhilfe, Medair, DanChurchAid, Marie Stopes, Mennonite Central Committee
2017	Doctors Without Borders
2019	Norwegian Church Aid, Team Rubicon, GOAL, Project Concern International, Operation Smile, Right To Play, FUPAD

== Disaster response ==
=== 2004 Asia tsunami ===
NetHope had already been developing the NetReliefKit with Cisco and Inmarsat, but when the tsunami in the Pacific hit, they saw it was necessary for NGOs to communicate with each other immediately, as many had lost this capability.

=== 2010 Haiti earthquake ===
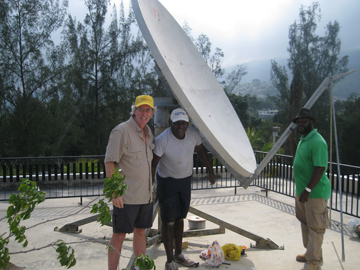
NetHope Global Connectivity Programs Director Joe Simmons in Haiti

Within days of the 7.0 earthquake that destroyed much of Haiti, NetHope responded by setting up telecommunications links among a dozen relief groups, thanks largely in part to a $1.25 million donation from Microsoft and its partnerships with Cisco and Intel. The 10 megabyte local network provided Internet connectivity and extensions to voice over Internet protocol (VoIP)-style phones so that NetHope's members could coordinate the delivery of supplies in Haiti and send need assessments to the rest of the world.

However, the temporary network came under criticism a month later from local Internet service providers (ISPs) who said that this temporary network was taking away their business. Inveneo, the company that NetHope tapped to build the network, defended the action by saying that in the days after the earthquake it was critical for NGOs to have reliable connectivity in order to coordinate their actions using resources such as Google Maps. Local ISP wired networks appeared to remain functional in the aftermath of the earthquake, but had lost electricity to their wireless base stations. An agreement between Inveneo and the local ISPs was to be made so ISPs would start receiving money from NGOs using their bandwidth.

=== 2013 Typhoon Haiyan, Philippines ===
On 8 November 2013, Typhoon Haiyan (known in the Philippines as Typhoon Yolanda), the largest typhoon in recorded history cut across the Visayas area of the Philippines. Over 14.1 million Filipinos were affected by the disaster and over 1.1 million houses were damaged either by strong winds or the storm surge that followed.

During the immediate disaster response, NetHope worked as part of the Emergency Telecommunications Cluster (ETC) to coordinate and establish connectivity in the worst affected areas. Members of the ETC worked together to provide connectivity to international and local response organizations in each location regardless of which ETC member provided the equipment and bandwidth.

NetHope, along with its partner British Telecom, established VSAT data services and VOIP voice services in Borongan, Roxas, and Estancia. Furthermore, NetHope acquired six Ku-Band VSAT terminals and received donated satellite bandwidth from AsiaSat, Speedcast, and SES. These were used to provide connectivity in Bogo, Concepcion, Bantayan Island, Maya, Carigara, and additional connectivity in Estancia. The donated bandwidth and services were scheduled to an end at the end of February 2014 when broadband or mobile data connectivity was scheduled be reinstated in most of these areas.

The following NetHope member organizations responded to Typhoon Haiyan: AmeriCares, Canadian Red Cross, CARE, Catholic Relief Services, ChildFund International, Christian Aid, Concern Worldwide, Direct Relief, Habitat for Humanity, Heifer International, International Federation of Red Cross/Red Crescent (IFRC), International Medical Corps (IMC), International Rescue Committee (IRC), Islamic Relief, Mercy Corps, Oxfam International, Plan International, Save the Children, SOS Children's Villages, and World Vision International.

=== 2015 Syrian refugee crisis, Europe ===
During the summer of 2015 and into 2016, NetHope installed wireless networks and mobile phone recharging systems along the European refugee migration route at more than 76 locations, including refugee camps and community centers. Most of these sites were in Greece, with several others deployed in the Balkans and Central Europe. In addition to providing network connectivity for refugee and aid workers' smartphones and other devices, NetHope partnered with Cisco's Tactical Operations and Microsoft to deploy cybersecurity protection to mitigate the risk that organized crime or combatants related to the Syrian Civil War might attempt to compromise sensitive information on user devices. Since the fall of 2015, the network has supported more than 600,000 devices, making it the largest purpose-built humanitarian network to date.
