= Walter Dawley =

American organist (1885-1961)

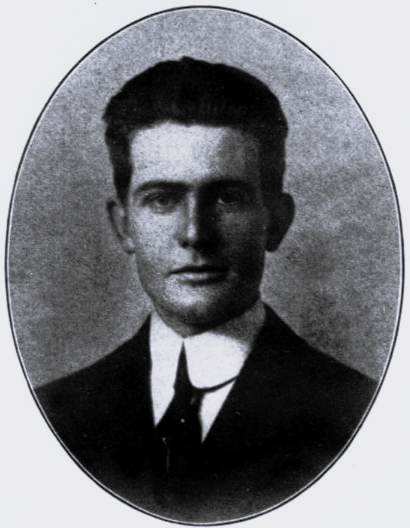
Portrait of organist Walter G. Dawley, c. 1910

Walter Gardner Dawley (1885-1961) was an American organist from Providence, Rhode Island and later Hartford, Connecticut. He was the chief organist at the former Poli's Capitol Theatre of Hartford and was one of the first organists to play for radio broadcast. He was also a founder of the Connecticut Council of the National Association of Organists, predecessor to the American Guild of Organists.

== Early life and education ==
Walter Gardner Dawley was born on November 23, 1885 in Providence, Rhode Island, the eldest son of Daniel D. and Katie Connelly Dawley. His father, Daniel, was a jeweler by trade. Walter Dawley first played organ as an assistant to organist William Harkness Arnold at All Saints Memorial Church in his youth. He also played piano while attending Providence Technical High School in the Class of 1905, playing for and organizing school music events. Dawley was a pupil of piano instructor Alzada J. Sprague of Providence. He first attended New York University in the summer of 1908. He studied organ at the New England Conservatory, the Institute of Musical Art and abroad under English professor and organist Joseph Cox Bridge. Dawley later studied at Cornell University under Arthur Edward Johnstone.

== Career ==
While in Providence, Walter Dawley was the organist of the First Presbyterian Church, the Pilgrim Congregational Church, the Church of the Mediator, St. Stephen's Episcopal Church and Grace Church. He was also an instructor at the Middlesex School, St. George's School and the "School of Church Music" at the Episcopal Theological School of Cambridge in 1915 and 1916 with Peter C. Lutkin, Charles Winfred Douglas and Walter J. Clemson. He married soprano and concert artist Olive Emory Russell in 1917, who also taught at the Middlesex School.

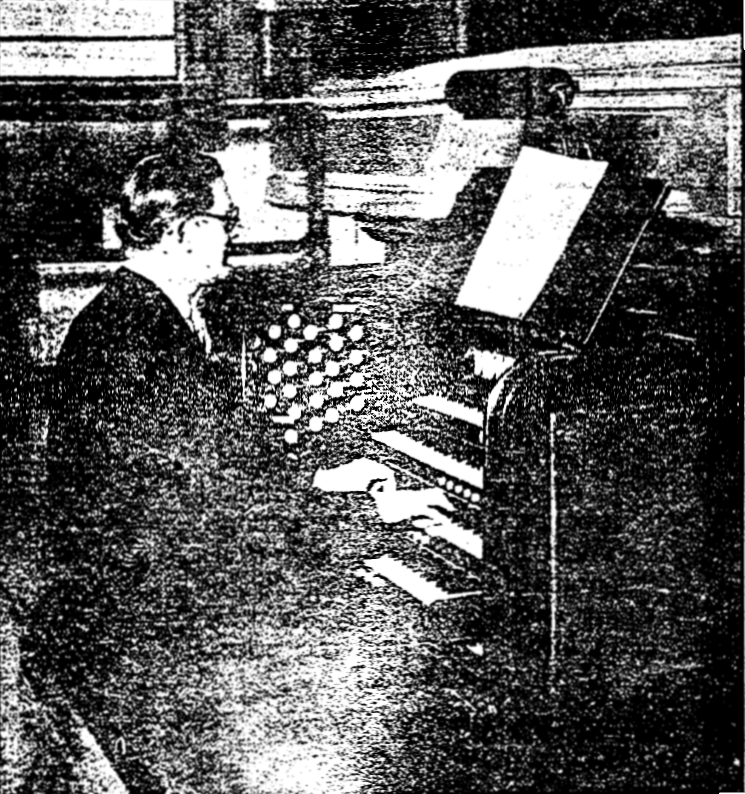
Walter Dawley rehearsing at the Möller organ of Poli's Capitol Theatre, 1925

Following a period as a music instructor and organist in Rhode Island and Massachusetts, he removed to Hartford, Connecticut. Dawley was the chief organist at S.Z. Poli's Capitol Theatre in Hartford by 1924. He accompanied silent films shown at the Capitol Theatre as early as 1921. He performed on a large theatre-style Möller organ. During his tenure, he accompanied various ensembles and opera singers, including Rosa Ponselle, John McCormack and Edgar Schofield. In 1925, he performed Theodore Dubuois' Fantaisie Triomphale with the Hartford Symphony Orchestra (not to be confused with the ensemble of the same name founded in 1934) at Poli's Capitol Theatre. Dawley also notably played The Sunken Cathedral by Debussy from memory, with the Philadelphia Orchestra. He was later an organ soloist and accompanist for guest stars visiting Bushnell Memorial Hall in Hartford. He participated in concerts for the Tercentary celebration of Hartford at Bushnell Memorial in August 1936. He also appeared alongside Glenn Miller's Army Air Force band at Bushnell Memorial in September 1943 playing military music for a war bond event.

In association with Clarence D. Tuska and the Radio Relay League, Dawley was among the first organists to play for radio in 1922 at station WQB. He continued to play organ for broadcasts from Hartford station WDAK that same year. The performances were broadcast live from Poli's Capitol Theatre in Hartford. Dawley also played the organ for station WTIC of Hartford. He was the first organist to broadcast over station WTIC in 1925. He was later the host of "Over the Coffee Table" and "Melodies for the Folks at Home" on WTIC. His solo organ concerts at Bushnell Memorial Hall were also broadcast from WTIC and via the National Broadcasting Company network. His performances were later broadcast on station WDRC.

In November 1928, Walter Dawley was one of the founding members of the Connecticut Council of the National Association of Organists.

Dawley left the Capitol Theatre and retired his WTIC remote broadcasts from the same venue by 1930. He resumed playing for churches in the 1930s in Hartford and surrounding towns. He was organist at the Christian Science and Unitarian Church in Hartford before 1936. In addition to playing for church services, he played electric organs installed at the former Heublein Hotel and Sage-Allen department store in Hartford. He also demonstrated Hammond organs for Watkins Brothers music store of the city.

== Volunteer work and later years ==
Dawley was known in Hartford for playing the organ annually for The Hartford Times' sponsored, Christmas Carol Sing, beginning in 1933. At the height of the Great Depression, he sponsored concerts for unemployed musicians to play in Bushnell Park in Hartford. In 1945, he played the organ during a production by the Army Signal Corps at the Conrose Skating Rink in Hartford promoting blind G.I.s.

Walter Dawley was last organist for the roller rink at Babb's Beach Amusement Park in Suffield, Connecticut up until his death in 1961.
