= WQB =

Radio station in Hartford, Connecticut (1921–1922)

WQB was a radio station, located in Hartford, Connecticut, that was licensed to the C. D. Tuska Company from August 1921 to June 1922. Although it was never formally classified as being a broadcasting station by the United States government, it was one of the first stations in the U.S. to make regular broadcasts intended for the general public, and many contemporary publications included it in their broadcasting station reviews.

== History ==
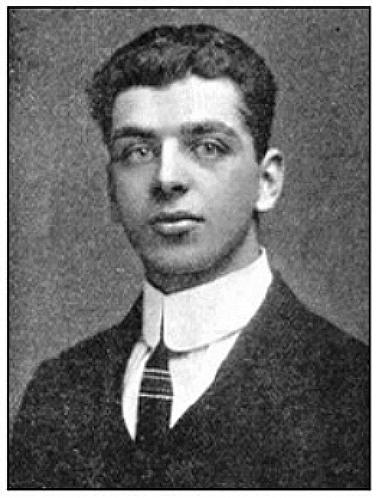
Clarence D. Tuska (1916)

On August 22, 1921, the C. D. Tuska Company of Hartford, Connecticut, was issued a Limited Commercial license for a new station, with the randomly assigned call letters of WQB, to be used in development in conjunction with "moving vehicles and general broadcasting". The station's assigned transmitting wavelengths were 200 meters (1500 kHz) for "ordinary" amateur work, 300 meters (1000 kHz), and 375 meters (800 kHz) for "relay or other communication".

Station owner Clarence D. Tuska had a well established background in radio technology. He had been one of the founders of the American Radio Relay League (ARRL) in 1914, acting as the league's original secretary, and, beginning with its 1915 founding, owned QST magazine. However, he resigned from the ARRL in March 1919 and transferred the magazine to that organization, due to his expanding activities in the commercial field.

In 1916, operating under a personal Special Amateur license, 1ZT, (Note: The "1" in 1ZT's call sign indicated that the station was located in the first Radio Inspection district, while the "Z" specified that the station was operating under a Special Amateur license.) Tuska began experimenting with radiotelephony, using an arc transmitter of his own design which employed tungsten electrodes to make audio transmissions, and by March of that year was broadcasting semi-regular phonograph concerts. During World War I, all civilian radio stations were shut down for the duration of the war. During this time, Tuska served as a 1st Lieutenant in the U.S. Army's Signal Corps. Following the war, he established the C. D. Tuska Company, which initially was a small concern that manufactured a line of radio receivers for amateurs and experimenters. The company obtained, from the Westinghouse Electric & Manufacturing Company, a valuable license to use the Armstrong regenerative patent in its receivers.

WQB's studio and transmitter were located at Tuska's home at 136 Oakland Terrace. In December 1921, he suffered a fractured skull, when a section of the station antenna fell on him. He used the station to investigate developing wireless telephones for two-way mobile communication, and in August 1921 there was a report of a successful test of "a full-fledged wireless outfit in the rear of [Fire Chief John C. Moran's] Marmon touring car".

WQB was also used for general entertainment broadcasting. In February 1922, it was reported that the station was now broadcasting on 360 meters (833 kHz), and Tuska had "just completed a 'broadcasting' room" at the station. The most prominently featured programs were twice-a-week evening broadcasts from the Capitol Theater, featuring organ recitals by Walter Dawley.

Although Tuska's company began as a small operation, in 1922 a national increase in the number of broadcasting stations caused an explosive growth in the radio industry. Tuska soon suspended most of WQB's broadcasts, with the explanation that he "...was obliged to discontinue broadcasting as he needed to devote all his time to the activities of the C. D. Tuska Co.", because of a recent factory expansion, plus plans to increase the work staff from 35 to 125 persons. Although there were occasional reports of additional broadcasts as late as April, regular operations had ceased, and WQB was formally deleted on June 24, 1922.

Tuska remained active in the radio field. In March 1922, he participated in the establishment of a new broadcasting station, WDAK, operated by the Hartford Courant, even loaning the newspaper the transmitting tubes formerly used at WQB, in order to help the station get on the air. By 1926, Tuska had arranged for the sale of his company to the A. Atwater Kent company, with Tuska becoming a patent attorney for the firm.

=== Pioneer broadcasting station status ===
At the time WQB received its initial (and only) station license in August 1921, there were no regulations in the United States defining broadcasting stations, so stations operating under an assortment of classifications were permitted to make regular broadcasts. Effective December 1, 1921, the Department of Commerce, which regulated U.S. radio at this time, established the first formal broadcasting service regulations, now requiring that stations making broadcasts intended for the general public had to hold a Limited Commercial license that specified operation on the designated broadcasting wavelengths of 360 meters (833 kHz) for entertainment, and 485 meters (619 kHz) for market and weather reports.

When this new standard was adopted, WQB already held a Limited Commercial license, and station publicity in early 1922 reported that the station was now transmitting on 360 meters. However, in the Department of Commerce's first cumulative list of broadcasting stations, dated April 1, 1922, WQB was not included among the 67 listed stations, nor was it included on any of the department's subsequent lists. In addition, WQB's eventual deletion was reported in "Commercial Land Stations" section of Radio Service Bulletin, instead of the "Broadcasting Station" section. It appears WQB was omitted from Commerce's broadcasting station lists because its August 1921 license specified operation on the wavelengths of 200, 300, and 375 meters, and it never received a license reflecting its later operation on 360 meters.

Independent of its formal classification, WQB was one of the first post-World War I stations to conduct regular entertainment broadcasts. (Note: According to the Department of Commerce accounting, the first broadcasting station in the state of Connecticut was A. C. Gilbert Company's WCJ in New Haven, licensed on September 29, 1921. WCJ was deleted on December 1, 1922.) In addition, when the Federal Radio Commission archived its early broadcasting station license holdings, WQB's file was included in its "Deleted broadcast license files (1921-1927)" collection.
