= VEC =

VEC may refer to:

- VEC-M1 (Vehículo de Exploración de Caballería), a Spanish Army wheeled reconnaissance vehicle
- Vellore Institute of Technology, formally was known as Vellore Engineering College
- Victorian Electoral Commission
- The Irish Vocational Education Committee
- Volunteer Examiner Coordinator, an organization approved to administer amateur radio license examinations in the USA
- Veranópolis Esporte Clube Recreativo e Cultural, a Brazilian football (soccer) club
- Vermont Electric Cooperative, United States
- Ventura (Amtrak station), California, United States; Amtrak station code VEC
- Virginia Employment Commission
- Virtual Experience Company, a former subsidiary of Blitz Games Studios
- Venerable English College, originally a Roman hospice, later a seminary for potential English Catholic priests

== See also ==
- Vec (disambiguation)
