= QEX =

- Editor: Kai Siwiak, KE4PT
- Categories: Amateur radio
- Frequency: Bimonthly
- Publisher: American Radio Relay League
- First issue: December, 1981
- Country: USA
- Based in: Newington, Connecticut
- Language: English
- Website: www.arrl.org/qex/
- ISSN: 0886-8093

QEX is a bimonthly magazine published by the American Radio Relay League. The magazine covers topics related to amateur radio and radiocommunication experimentation. The magazine features advanced technical articles on the theory, design, and construction of radio antennas and equipment. The magazine is published in English and has a worldwide subscription base.

QEX began in December, 1981 as a magazine carrying the subtitle "ARRL Experimenter's Exchange". The founding editor was Paul Rinaldo, W4RI, who also contributed many technical articles to the ARRL membership journal, QST. In January, 2000, the American Radio Relay League purchased a competing publication, Communications Quarterly from CQ Communications, Inc. (who also publish the CQ Amateur Radio magazine), and merged the contents into QEX. The magazine's subtitle changed to "A Forum for Communications Experimenters".
