= CSCE =

CSCE may refer to

- China State Construction Engineering
- Coffee, Sugar and Cocoa Exchange which merged to form the New York Board of Trade
- Commission on Security and Cooperation in Europe, a U.S. government agency
- Conference on Security and Co-operation in Europe which preceded the Organization for Security and Co-operation in Europe
- Canadian Society for Civil Engineering
- Certificate of Successful Completion of Examination, used to record results of U.S. amateur radio tests administered by agents of a Volunteer Examiner Coordinator.
