= W1AW =

Amateur radio station in the United States

Coordinates: 41°42′53″N 72°43′38″W

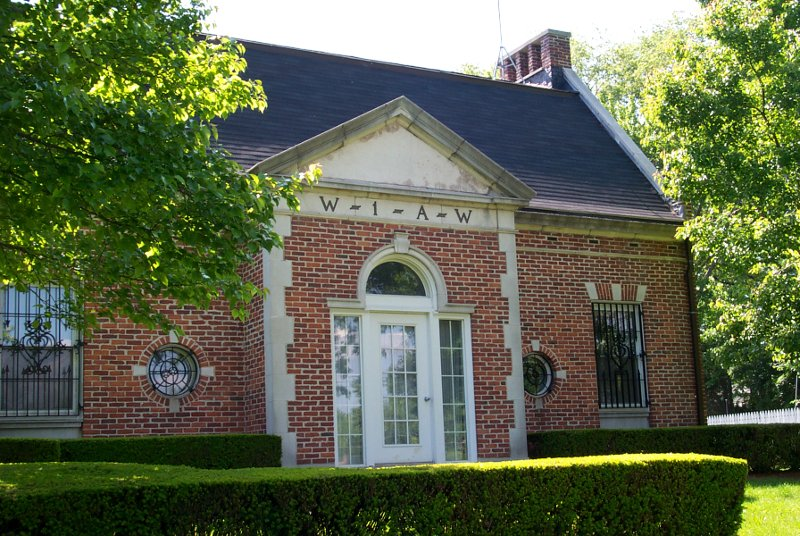
A 2003 image of the W1AW building located in Newington, Connecticut, US.

W1AW is both the amateur radio call sign and the primary operating station of the American Radio Relay League (ARRL). This station, which is commonly called the Hiram Percy Maxim Memorial Station, is located on the grounds of ARRL Headquarters in Newington, Connecticut. It was inspired by Maxim's 1AW callsign which predated the use of the AA-AL, K, N and W prefixes. The station routinely transmits bulletins and Morse code practice using common amateur radio frequencies. During a communications emergency bulletins are transmitted hourly in order to keep amateur radio operators informed.

== History ==
The original ARRL station was licensed with the callsign of W1MK and located in a National Guard building at Brainard Field in Hartford, Connecticut. After eight years of operation this flood plain location was destroyed by the waters of the Connecticut River in a 1936 flood. During this same year Hiram Percy Maxim, president and co-founder of the ARRL, died after serving 22 years as the organization's president. It was decided by the ARRL board of directors that a new station would be built as a memorial to their recently lost president and that the new station would assume his callsign of W1AW. On September 2, 1938 the new station was dedicated with the ceremonies being broadcast nationally over the radio. The Hiram Percy Maxim Memorial Station building appears much as it did when first built in 1938 and is now located next to the ARRL headquarters which was built in 1963.

The station was constructed on what was then 7 acres (28,000 m^{2}) rural in Newington, Connecticut, purchased for $2,200 from Ms. Elsie Starr (the only nearby resident and namesake of today's HQ framing Starr Avenue). The station's dedication on September 2, 1938 was of such significance in its day that it was carried live nationally on the CBS radio network; this was accomplished with the aid of Connecticut powerhouses WTIC and WDRC. The station was staffed by Hal Bubb, W1JTD, and George Hart, W1NJM.

The station was soon affected by a hurricane, losing power and proving the wisdom of installing emergency generators. It would be years before they were used once installed.

The night of December 7, 1941, saw Hart and Bubb alerting the nation's amateurs that the FCC had closed down amateur stations, following the attack on Pearl Harbor. This continued for several months until W1AW itself was ordered off the air by the FCC. This condition would exist until October 31, 1945, following Japan's surrender. On that day, W1AW returned to the air to announce the methodical reopening of amateur radio activity.

In 1964, an addition and other renovations were made to the station following the closure of the La Salle Road offices in favor of the newly constructed offices used today by the ARRL.

By 1988, under the tutelage of Chuck Bender, W1WPR, the Maxim station was renovated again, adding such amenities as a new kitchenette, toilet, workshop and a meeting room (on the station's second floor). Further improvements included glass walled operating studios, new operating tables, and modern rack mounted equipment placed within climate controlled spaces.

== Role in modern amateur radio ==
W1AW is the flagship station for amateur radio operation within the United States. Using pre-established shortwave frequencies and Maxim's distinctive call sign (W1AW), this station transmits one-way voice and digital bulletins in addition to Morse code training practice. The transmissions are broadcast Monday through Friday with the first broadcast at 9AM ET daily and the last at 11PM ET. During communication emergencies bulletins are broadcast utilizing SSB and FM voice every hour, RTTY at 15 minutes past the hour, and CW at 30 minutes past the hour.

=== Morse code practice ===
The text of the daily W1AW code practice sessions is taken directly from the pages of recent issues of QST, the ARRL's monthly magazine. At the beginning of each practice session the QST year and month of publication as well as the page numbers are given followed by the article being transmitted at 5, 7-1/2, 10, 13 and 15 words per minute for "slow code" and 35, 30, 25, 20, 15, 13 and 10 for "fast code". Because these training sessions are scheduled for specific published days, times, and code speeds they are useful for anyone interested in learning Morse code or improving their copying speed.

=== Bulletins ===
W1AW transmits bulletins of interest to the amateur radio community in a variety of formats, including single sideband and FM voice, CW (Morse code), RTTY, MFSK16, and PSK31. These bulletins include notification of significant amateur radio events, including frequencies used to assist in rescue efforts during state or national disasters.

CW or Morse code bulletins are sent at a speed of 18 words per minute while digital bulletins are transmit first in 45.45 baud RTTY followed by the PSK31 and MFSK16 modes "as time allows".

Copies of bulletins transmitted by W1AW can be downloaded from http://www.arrl.org/w1aw ("Hiram Percy Maxim Memorial Station").

==== Non-bulletin digital data ====
Keplerian elements for many amateur radio satellites are transmitted utilizing the common digital bulletin frequencies on Tuesdays and Fridays at 6:30 PM ET.
A DX bulletin "replaces or is added to the regular bulletins" every week between 8 PM ET Thursday and 8 PM ET Friday.

=== Guest operators ===
Amateur radio operators who visit the Hiram Percy Maxim Memorial Station may operate the equipment and temporarily use the W1AW callsign. The current schedule allows for "guest operators" from 10 AM ET to 12 PM ET and 1 PM ET to 3:45 PM ET Monday through Friday excluding holidays. An original or photocopy of a valid Federal Communications Commission (FCC) issued amateur license is required to operate the station.

W1AW offers a QSL card for those who have contacted the station over the air. The "retro"-looking card can be obtained by any licensed amateur—not just ARRL members.

=== Qualifying runs ===
Qualifying Runs are transmitted on the same frequencies as the CW (Morse code) transmissions. At the beginning of each code practice session, the schedule for the next qualifying run is presented. By successfully deciphering one minute of the message and submitting to W1AW a certification that the copy was made by the requester without aid a Certificate of Code Proficiency will be issued to the individual. Submissions, which must include the $10 fee, should be mailed to W1AW Qualifying Run, 225 Main Street, Newington, CT USA 06111. An amateur radio license is not required in order to receive this certificate.

== Broadcast frequencies ==
CW (Morse code)
Frequency	Amateur band
1.8025 MHz	160 meters
3.5815 MHz	80 meters
7.0475 MHz	40 meters
14.0475 MHz	20 meters
18.0975 MHz	17 meters
21.0675 MHz	15 meters
28.0675 MHz	10 meters
50.350 MHz	6 meters
147.555 MHz	2 meters

SSB and FM voice
Frequency	Amateur band	Mode
1.855 MHz	160 meters	LSB
3.99 MHz	80 meters	LSB
7.29 MHz	40 meters	AM, double-sideband
14.29 MHz	20 meters	USB
18.16 MHz	17 meters	USB
21.39 MHz	15 meters	USB
28.59 MHz	10 meters	USB
50.350 MHz	6 meters	USB
147.555 MHz	2 meters	FM

RTTY45 /PSK31 /MFSK16
Frequency	Amateur band
N/A	160 meters
3.5975 MHz	80 meters
7.095 MHz	40 meters
14.095 MHz	20 meters
18.1025 MHz	17 meters
21.095 MHz	15 meters
28.095 MHz	10 meters
50.350 MHz	6 meters
147.555 MHz	2 meters

Due to changes in ionospheric propagation caused by changing maximum usable frequency and frequency of optimum transmission it may not be possible to receive W1AW clearly on all frequencies. Note that the voice broadcasts are sent in the common mode for each frequency.

== Broadcast schedule ==
W1AW Daily Broadcast Schedule
Mode	Type	Broadcast Times (UTC)			
CW (Morse code)	Practice	1400z	1700z	0000z	0300z
CW (Morse code)	Bulletin	2200z	0100z	0400z	-
RTTY45 / PSK31 / MFSK16	Bulletin	2300z		0200z	
RTTY45 / PSK31 / MFSK16	Keplerian elements	Tuesdays 2330z		Fridays 2330z	
RTTY45 / PSK31 / MFSK16	DX Bulletin	From 8 PM Thursday until 8 PM Friday (see notes).			
Miscellaneous Modes	"Visiting Operator" Time	1500z to 1700z		1800z to 2045z	
SSB and FM Voice	Voice Bulletin	0245z			

Special Notes:

- A DX bulletin either replaces or is appended to the regular bulletins between 8 PM NAEST Thursday and 8 PM NAEST Friday.
- W1AW uses local North American Eastern Standard Time and observes daylight saving time in the summer. Listeners outside of the United States may therefore see the times change due to daylight saving time.
- Every Monday the 9 AM ET CW transmission is omitted.
- The digital bulletins, which include RTTY45, PSK31, and MFSK16, are sent initially utilizing 45.45 baud RTTY followed by PSK31 then MFSK16 "as time allows".
- W1AW is closed on the following holidays: New Year's Day, Presidents' Day, Good Friday, Memorial Day, Independence Day, Labor Day, Thanksgiving Day (and the following Friday), and Christmas Day.
