= Vec =

Vec may mean:

Mathematics:

- vec(A), the vectorization of a matrix A.
- Vec denotes the category of vector spaces over the reals.

Other:

- Venetian language (Vèneto), language code.
- Vecuronium, a muscle relaxant.
- vec, a sentient moravec robot from the Orion's Arm Universe Project (see also Moravec_(robot))

== See also ==
- VEC (disambiguation)
