= Title 47 CFR Part 97 =

FCC rules and regulations pertaining to amateur radio

In the U.S., Part 97 is the section of Federal Communications Commission (FCC) rules and regulations that pertains to amateur radio and the conduct of amateur radio operators. It is a part of Title 47 of the Code of Federal Regulations (CFR).

== Subparts ==
Part 97 consists of six subparts (A through F) and two appendices.

=== A. General Provisions ===
Subpart A contains fifteen sections, numbered 97.1–31.

Subpart A defines a number of terms relevant to the provisions of Part 97 and establishes the amateur service as a "voluntary, noncommercial communications service" devoted to advancement of the amateur art, the skills associated with it, and the international goodwill that it brings, especially with regard to the provision of emergency communications. It also establishes the basic constraints and rights that pertain to amateur licensing and conduct, including licensing requirements and limitations on station equipment and power output.

=== B. Station Operating Standards ===
Subpart B contains eleven sections, numbered 97.101–121.

Subpart B details the standards of communication conduct expected of amateur operators, including the types of transmissions authorized and prohibited by the FCC, limitations pertaining to third-party and international communications, and on-air station identification requirements.

Among other limitations, this section forbids the transmission of "music using a phone emission," except incidentally during authorized rebroadcasting of signals from a U.S. government space station (typically communications from the Space Shuttle).

=== C. Special Operations ===
Subpart C contains eleven sections, numbered 97.201–221.

Subpart C details rules and regulations pertaining specifically to a number of special operating procedures, including auxiliary and repeater stations, message forwarding, communications between Earth and space stations, telecommand and the transmission of coded telemetry data, and automatic station control.

=== D. Technical Standards ===
Subpart D contains nine sections, numbered 97.301–317.

Subpart D sets forth all requirements pertaining to amateur radio frequency allocations, the emission modes allowed, and the technical standards according to which they may be used.

=== E. Emergency Communications ===
Subpart E contains four sections, numbered 97.401–407.

Subpart E supports the service of amateur radio operators in times of disaster by establishing basic standard operating procedures to use in case an emergency should occur. Primarily, it authorizes any use of radio technology for the "immediate safety of human life and immediate protection of property," regardless of all other FCC regulations, when no alternative is available. It also establishes the Radio Amateur Civil Emergency Service (RACES), a civil defense communications service intended for activation in times of war or threat to national security.

=== F. Qualifying Examination Systems ===
Subpart F contains thirteen sections, numbered 97.501–527.

Subpart F lays out the examination and certification systems whereby amateur radio operators are licensed. This includes outlining the structure and conduct of Volunteer Examiner Coordinators (VECs), organizations that accredit and organize the volunteer examiners (VEs) who administer test elements to prospective licensees.

=== Appendices ===
Part 97 has two appendices:

- Appendix 1: Places Where the Amateur Service is Regulated by the FCC
- Appendix 2: VEC Regions

== See also ==
- Part 15
