= WCJ =

Radio station in New Haven, Connecticut (1921–1922)

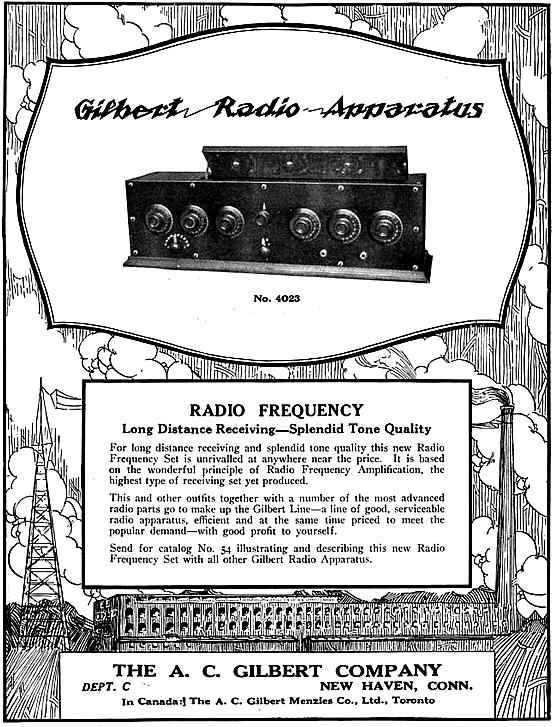
1922 advertisement for the A. C. Gilbert Company. WCJ's antenna, strung between a tower and a smokestack above the company's factory, is partly visible.

WCJ was a radio station, located in New Haven, Connecticut, that was licensed to the A. C. Gilbert Company from September 29, 1921 to December 1, 1922. Although short-lived, it was the first broadcasting station licensed in the state of Connecticut, and one of the first in the United States.

== History ==
Founded in 1909, the A. C. Gilbert Company was a prominent toy manufacturer with a target audience consisting primarily of young boys, best known for its Erector Set construction sets. After War World One, the company briefly expanded into selling amateur radio equipment, offering "Superdyne" regenerative vacuum tube receivers designed by the C. D. Tuska Company.

In conjunction with the radio receiver sales, on September 29, 1921 the company was issued a Limited Commercial radio license with the randomly assigned call letters of WCJ, operating on a wavelength of 360 meters (833 kHz). There were no formal regulations in the United States about stations making broadcasts intended for the general public until December 1, 1921, when the Department of Commerce began requiring Limit Commercial licenses operating on wavelengths of 360 or 485 meters (833 and 619 kHz), which WCJ already held. This station was located at the A. C. Gilbert factory at 493 Blatchley Avenue in New Haven. A 125-foot (38 meter) tower was constructed in back of the factory, and an antenna and counterpoise were strung, over the building, from this tower to a pre-existing smokestack.

The company inaugurated a limited series of broadcasts, both in Morse code and full audio, some by company employees drafted by the company president, Alfred Carlton Gilbert, to provide entertainment. WCJ's most prominent use occurred in the summer of 1922, when the company outfitted a railroad car with samples from its catalog, which company publicity described as "The most far-reaching and effective undertaking in co-operative merchandising between manufacturers and dealers ever conceived". Included was a demonstration radio receiver used for reception of twice-daily broadcasts made by WCJ. (Once the train traveled beyond the station's range, covertly made transmissions from within the railroad car were substituted).

The company soon faced difficulty related to its radio receiver sales, when the Radio Corporation of America complained that the patent rights held by Tuska were not transferable to additional companies like A. C. Gilbert. To avoid a lawsuit, the company ended the offending receiver sales, and WCJ ceased operations, and was formally deleted on December 1, 1922.

Although WCJ was no longer in operation, the radio tower was left standing, and large letters spelling "ERECTOR" were installed vertically down the structure. This tower remained standing until January 9, 1978, when it was knocked down by a wind storm.

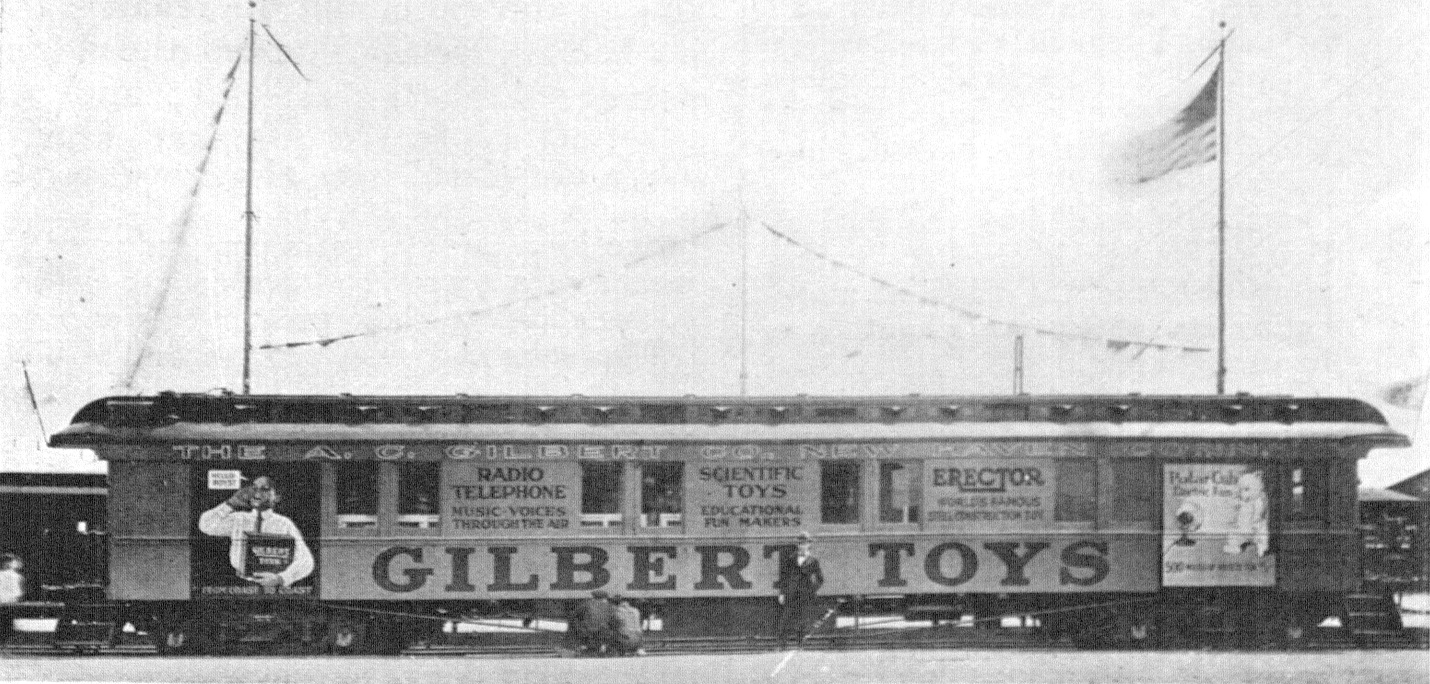
In the summer of 1922, the A. C. Gilbert Co. outfitted a railroad "Dealers demonstration car" which included an antenna, strung between two flagpoles, used for receiving WCJ broadcasts.

== See also ==
- List of initial AM-band station grants in the United States
