= So Goes My Love =

1946 film by Frank Ryan

- Directed by: Frank Ryan
- Screenplay by: Bruce Manning; James Clifden
- Based on: A Genius in the Family; 1936 memoir by Hiram Percy Maxim
- Produced by: Bruce Manning; Jack H. Skirball
- Starring: Myrna Loy; Don Ameche
- Cinematography: Joseph A. Valentine
- Edited by: Ted J. Kent
- Music by: Hans J. Salter
- Production company: Skirball-Manning Productions
- Distributed by: Universal Pictures
- Release date: May 1, 1946
- Running time: 88 minutes
- Country: United States
- Language: English

So Goes My Love (released as A Genius in the Family in the UK) is an American 1946 comedy-drama film, produced by Universal Pictures. It is based on a true story, A Genius in the Family, the memoir of Hiram Percy Maxim, which focuses on the relationship between Maxim and his father, Sir Hiram Stevens Maxim.

The film was Myrna Loy's first starring role as a freelance artist following her departure from M-G-M.

== Plot ==
Farmer's daughter Jane Budden sells her entire pig herd and moves to Brooklyn to find a husband. On the way to the home of her cousin, Garnet Allison, Jane runs into Hiram Maxim, an eccentric inventor who is her cousin's neighbor. Jane scandalizes local society by saying she will not marry for love; she merely wants a rich husband who can give her the life of ease and culture she has long dreamed of.

Amused by Jane's announcement, Hiram visits Jane and tells her she can forget about marrying him. Jane is attracted to Hiram, but angered at his effrontery. She is amused when one of Hiram's inventions turns out badly and Hiram is publicly humiliated. Jane goes to a dance, where Hiram makes negative comments on each of her suitors, especially rich real estate developer and attorney Josephus Ford. Jane agrees to marry Josephus. Hiram gate crashes Jane's engagement party, where Jane is dismayed to learn that Josephus wants her to sign a prenuptial agreement and believes Jane should be frugal, silent, and matronly. When Jane learns that Josephus has just invested in a pork-packing plant, she breaks her engagement, rushes to Hiram's home, and proposes to him herself.

Hiram and Jane marry. Even though Hiram's inventions are only marginally profitable, the couple is happy. Jane gives birth to a son, Percy, whom Hiram raises in an unusual, freestyle manner to encourage his creativity and confidence. With Jane's constant encouragement, Hiram finally begins inventing things which meet practical needs and bring in a sizable income. A local organization decides to honor Hiram for his inventions by asking him to sit for a portrait. Hiram refuses. Jane, pregnant with a second child, hires the eccentric artist Magel to paint the portrait anyway. Shortly thereafter, Percy tries to be amusing by adorning his dog Skipper with a baby bonnet, which Jane had received as a gift for the expected new arrival. When Percy and his mother chase the dog to retrieve the bonnet, Jane moves a piece of furniture and jeopardizes her pregnancy. Her physician fears she may lose the baby and her life, and Percy feels extremely guilty, thinking he has caused his mother to nearly die. Jane does recover and gives birth to a healthy son. An ecstatic Hiram has the entire family sit for Magel and a portrait.

== Cast ==
- Myrna Loy as Jane Budden Maxim
- Don Ameche as Hiram Stephens Maxim
- Rhys Williams as Magel
- Bobby Driscoll as Percy Maxim
- Richard Gaines as Mr. Josephus Ford
- Molly Lamont as Cousin Garnet Allison
- Sarah Padden as Bridget
- Renie Riano as Emily
- Clara Blandick as Mrs. Meade
- Howard Freeman as Willis
- John Gallaudet as Theodore Allison
- Pierre Watkin as Committee Man (uncredited)

== Production notes ==
The music in the film was composed by Hans J. Salter.

The Universal Studios backlot was used for the wagon ride scene.

The house facades used in the film were built on Universal's Stage 12. In 1950, two of these facades were moved from Stage 12 to Universal's new backlot set, named Colonial Street. The "Maxim House" was later used for the television series The Munsters. The "Maxim House" was also used in the movie One Desire (1955), while the "Allison House" was used in the movie Harvey (1950). The "Harvey House" was also used for the film The Ghost and Mr. Chicken (1966). Colonial Street was renamed Wisteria Lane when production on the television series Desperate Housewives began: the "Harvey House" is 4349 Wisteria Lane, and the "Munster House" is 4351 Wisteria Lane.
