= A. C. Gilbert Company =

American toy company

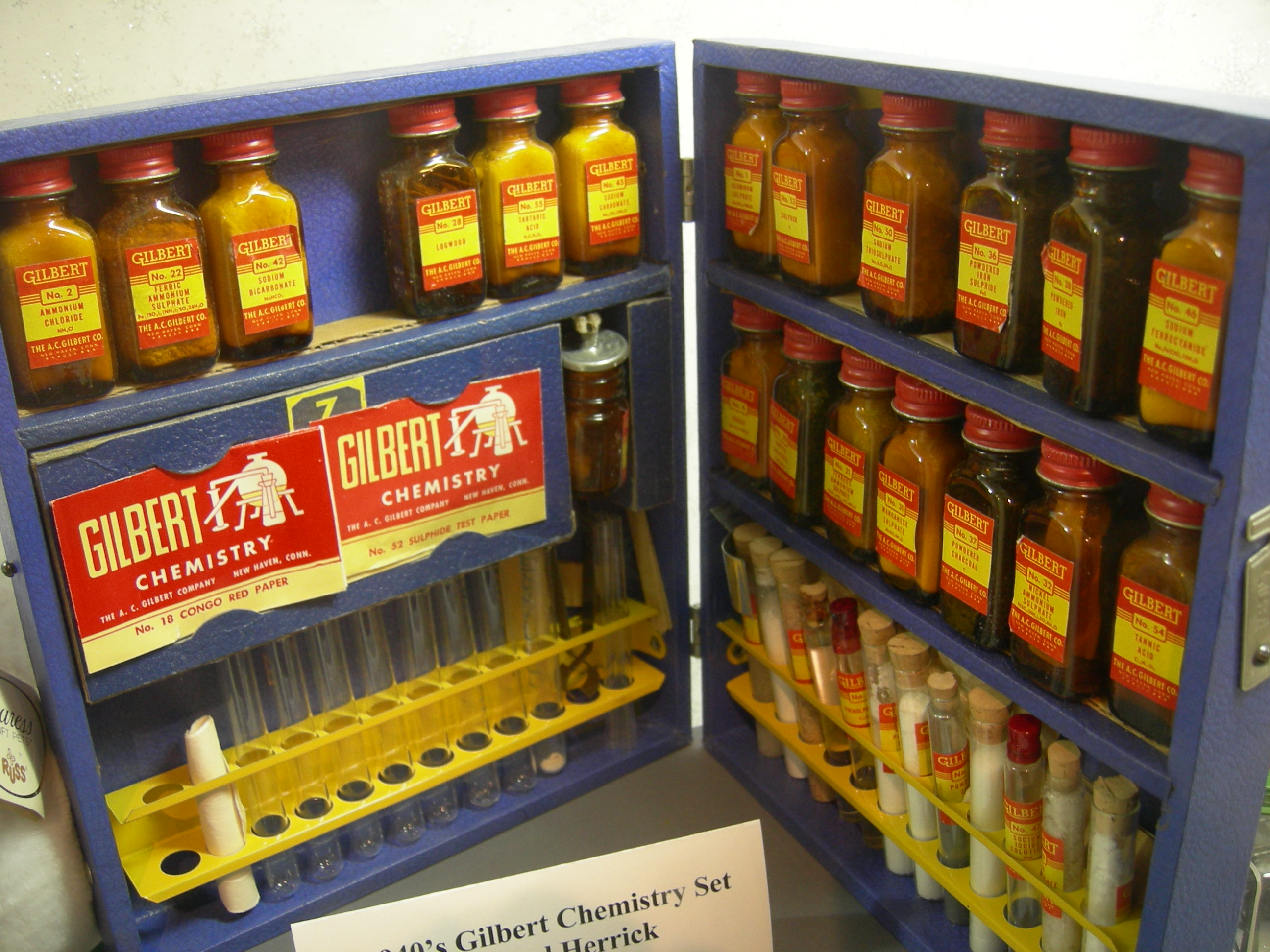
- A 1940s Gilbert chemistry set.
- Formerly: Mysto Manufacturing Company
- Industry: Manufacturing
- Founded: 1909 in Westville, Connecticut
- Founders: Alfred Carlton Gilbert; John Petrie
- Defunct: 1967

The A. C. Gilbert Company was an American toy company, once one of the largest in the world. Gilbert originated the Erector Set, a construction toy similar to Meccano, and made chemistry sets, microscope kits, and a line of inexpensive reflector telescopes. In 1938, Gilbert purchased the American Flyer, a manufacturer of toy trains. The Gilbert Company struggled after the death of its founder in 1961 and went out of business in 1967. Its trademarks and toy lines were sold to other companies.

== History ==
First known as the Mysto Manufacturing Company, the company was founded in 1909 in Westville, Connecticut, by Alfred Carlton Gilbert, a magician, and his friend John Petrie, to provide supplies for magic shows. Their "Mysto Magic" magician's sets were marketed from the 1910s until the 1950s. The sets contained a variety of objects including interlocking rings, playing cards, and a magic wand.

In 1911, Gilbert invented the Erector construction toy concept, inspired by railroad girders used by the New York, New Haven and Hartford Railroad in its mainline electrification project. Gilbert and his wife Mary developed cardboard prototypes to get the right sizes, openings, and angles to create a robust buildable girder pattern. The Erector set was introduced in 1913, as the Mysto Erector Structural Steel Builder, at the New York City Toy Fair.

In 1916, the company name was changed from Mysto Manufacturing Company to A. C. Gilbert Company.

In 1920, the company began selling regenerative vacuum tube radio receivers designed by the C. D. Tuska Company, and the following year, to increase interest in radio, began operating station WCJ, the first broadcasting station licensed in the state of Connecticut. However, the receiver sales were ended after the Westinghouse Electric & Manufacturing Company threatened legal action, on the grounds that Tuska's patent rights did not extend to other companies, and WCJ was shut down in late 1922.

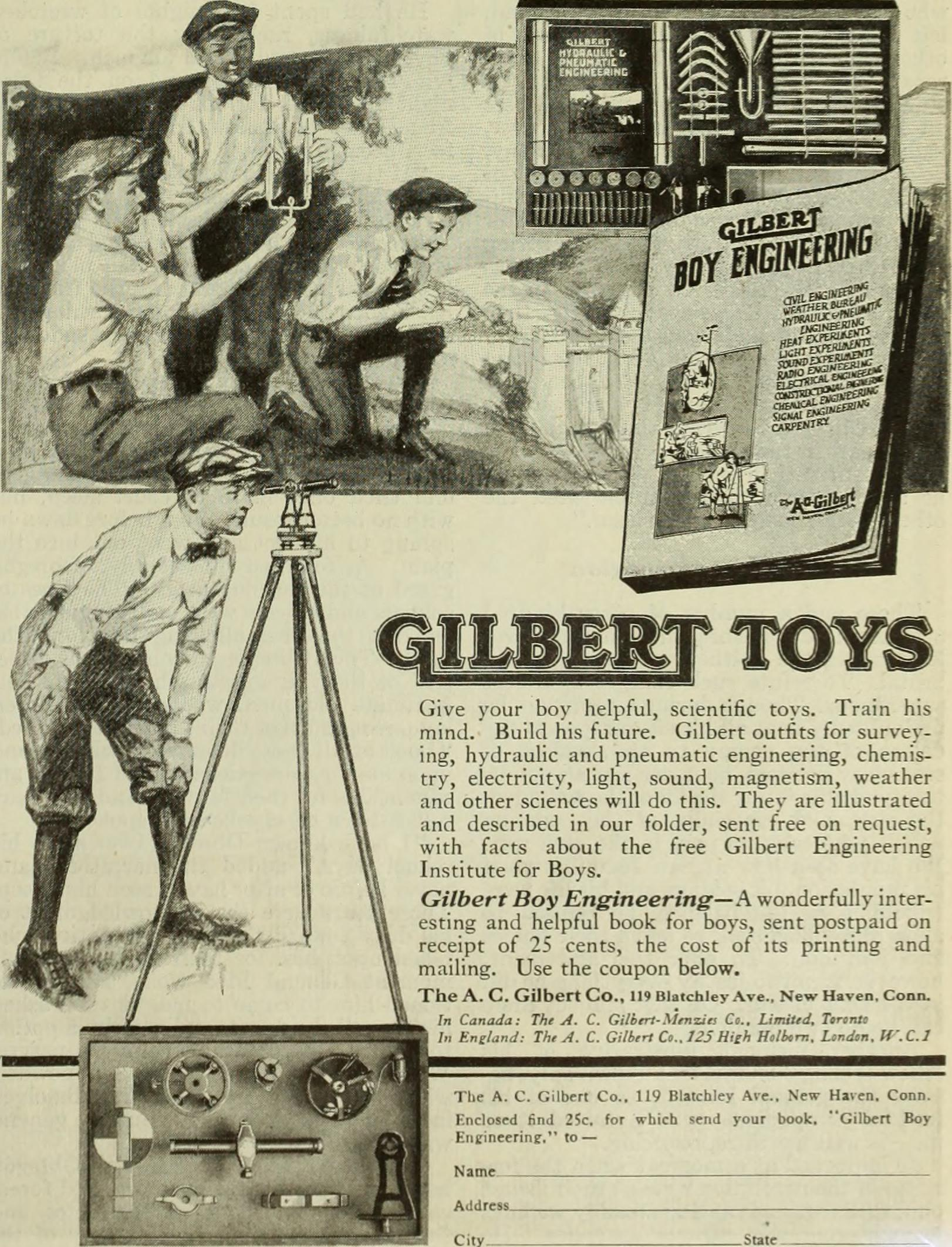
A.C. Gilbert ad in The Saturday Evening Post in 1920.

Beginning in 1922, A. C. Gilbert made chemistry sets in various sizes. The instruction manuals were co-edited by Treat Baldwin Johnson, an organic chemist and Sterling Professor at Yale university, and E. M. Shelton, one of Johnson's graduate students.

Between 1946 and 1966, the company manufactured toy trains called the American Flyer.

In the 1950s, sets for other budding scientists included those to investigate radioactivity using the Gilbert U-238 Atomic Energy Laboratory, a kit featuring a Geiger counter and radioactive samples.

A line of inexpensive reflector telescopes followed the Sputnik-inspired science craze in the late 1950s. In 1958, the company promoted its science toys by commissioning a comic book, Adventures in Science, from Custom Comics. In the comic, a mysterious "Mr. Science" leaps through time and space with a bored teenage boy to interest him in science.

In 1965, A. C. Gilbert produced James Bond movie tie-in figures and a slot car road race set featuring Bond's Aston Martin DB5.
