= Amateur auxiliary =

Defunct US amateur radio organization

The amateur auxiliary was an American amateur radio organization operated by the American Radio Relay League between 1994 and 2019 that was authorized by and worked in conjunction with the Federal Communications Commission (FCC). The Auxiliary consisted of official observer volunteer amateur radio operators who monitored amateur radio service frequencies. This was one way in which the FCC encouraged amateur radio operators in the United States to self-police.

== Official observer ==
If the official observers (OO) hear something that, in their judgment, is in violation of Federal Communications Commission (FCC) regulations, they will send a postcard to the amateur radio station describing the infraction. The receipt of an official observer card is merely advice from another amateur radio operator and has no legal authority to it. Official observers are trained to deal only with clear and unambiguous violations of FCC rules and not become interpreters in areas that are controversial.

To become an official observer, the amateur must first be appointed to the position by their section manager. ARRL field services will send the amateur a manual which describes the amateur auxiliary, how the official observer is supposed to conduct business, and several technical details concerning FCC rules and regulations. The potential official observer also receives a self-paced test that they must pass to receive the appointment. Once the test is forwarded back to ARRL field services (and passes), the amateur receives their official observer appointment. The OO performs his/her function by listening for such things as frequency instability, harmonics, hum, key clicks, broad signals, distorted audio, over deviation, out-of-band operation, etc.

In hard-core rules violations cases, OOs refer problems to higher echelons of the amateur auxiliary and may be requested to gather evidence for possible FCC enforcement actions.

== Official observer coordinator ==
The official observer coordinator (OOC) is an ARRL section-level leadership official, appointed by the section manager (SM), for two related purposes: to supervise the maintenance monitoring work of the section official observers, and to coordinate special amateur auxiliary efforts with headquarters and the SM.

With the inception of the amateur auxiliary to the FCC, the role of the OOC is greater today than ever before. A key liaison in the auxiliary, the OOC assists OOs in evidence gathering and conveys evidentiary materials to headquarters for handling with the FCC.

== Local interference committees ==
Local interference committees are formed to "track down and resolve repeater jamming problems."

== Current FCC actions ==
Current FCC enforcement actions, including those base on reports from the amateur auxiliary are available.
