= Hiram Percy Maxim =

American inventor and radio pioneer (1869–1936)

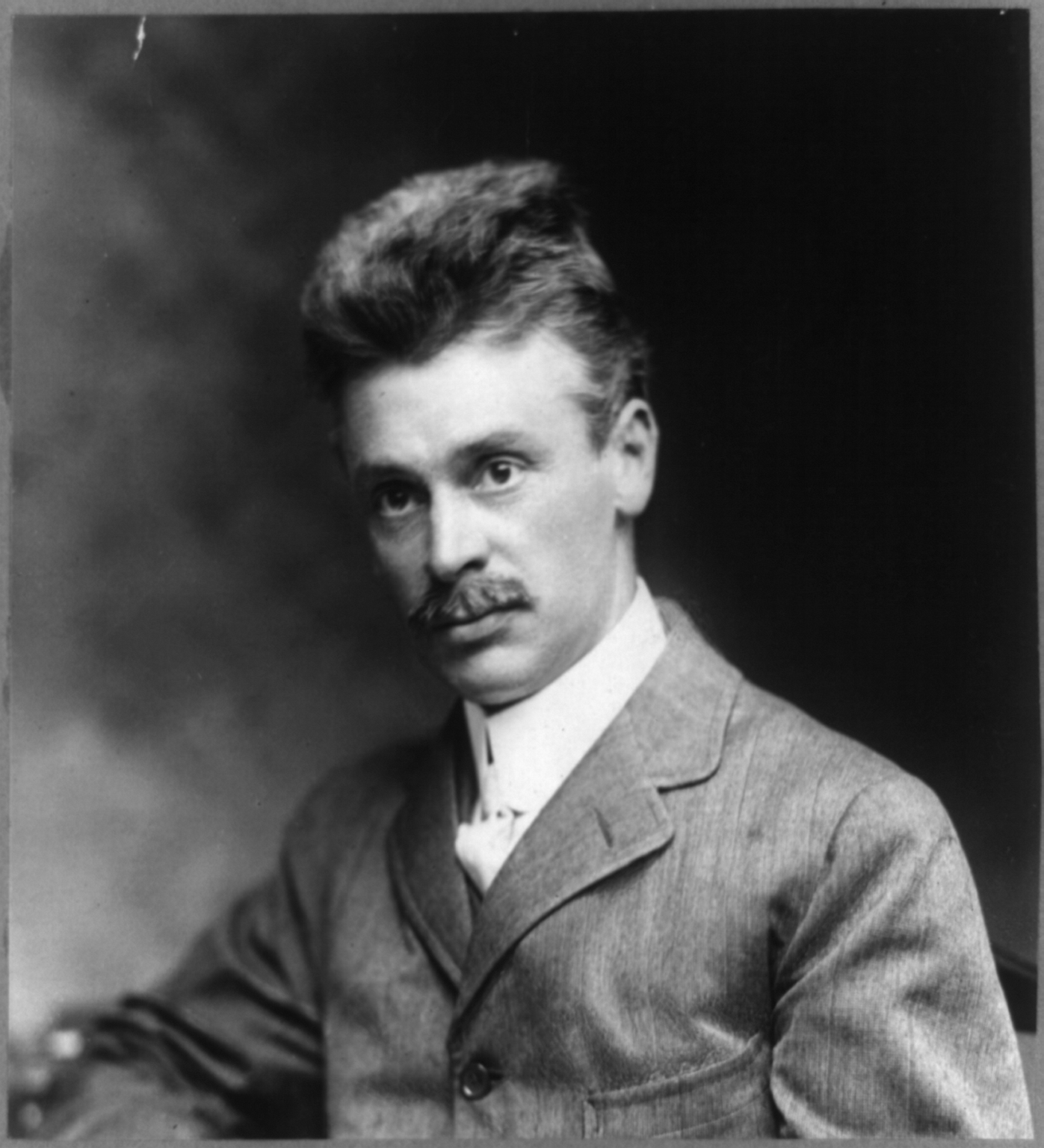
- Maxim c. 1914
- Born: September 2, 1869; Brooklyn, New York City, U.S.
- Died: February 17, 1936 (aged 66); La Junta, Colorado, U.S.
- Resting place: Rose Hill Cemetery
- Education: Massachusetts Institute of Technology (1886)
- Occupation: Inventor
- Known for: Silencer; American Radio Relay League
- Spouse: Josephine Hamilton (m. 1898)
- Children: 2
- Father: Hiram Maxim
- Relatives: Hudson Maxim (uncle)
- Call sign: W1AW (most notable)

Signature
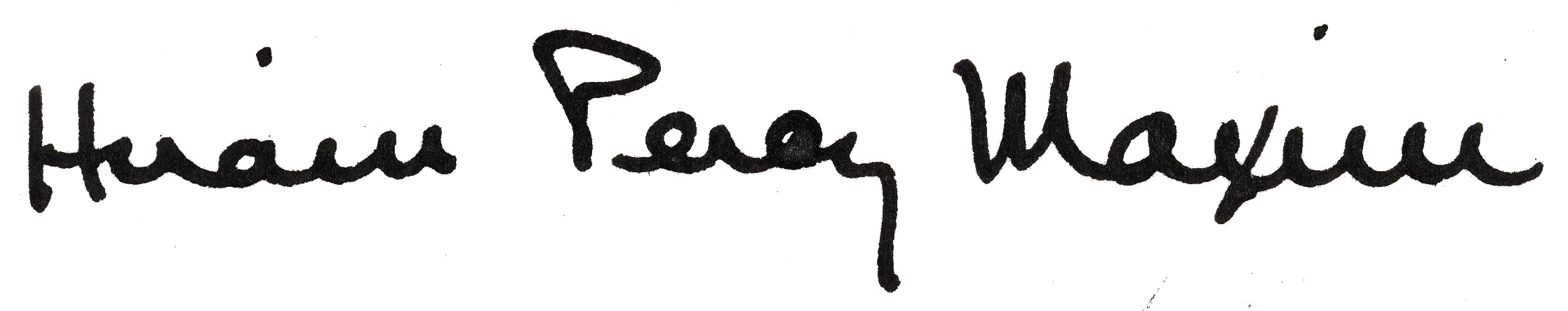

Hiram Percy Maxim (September 2, 1869 – February 17, 1936) was an American inventor and radio pioneer who co-founded the American Radio Relay League with Clarence D. Tuska. Maxim is credited with inventing and selling the first commercially successful firearm silencer. He also developed mufflers for internal combustion engines.

== Early life and career ==
Hiram Percy Maxim was born on September 2, 1869, in Brooklyn, New York City, the son of Hiram Maxim, the inventor of the Maxim gun. He was the nephew of Hudson Maxim, an inventor of explosives and ballistic propellants. He had two sisters, Florence Maxim, who married George Albert Cutter, and Adelaide Maxim, who married Eldon Joubert, Ignacy Jan Paderewski's piano tuner. In 1875, the family moved from Brooklyn to Fanwood, New Jersey, with his father joining the rest of the family on weekends. At age 17, Hiram was a mechanical engineering graduate, class of 1886, of the Massachusetts Institute of Technology (then a two-year course). He went to work for various electric utility companies in Boston.

Beginning in 1892, Maxim worked at the American Projectile Company of Lynn, Massachusetts, and tinkered nights on his own internal combustion engine. He admitted his ignorance of engine developments in Germany by Maybach, Daimler, and Benz, and he later explained that he "was staggered at the amount of time required to build one small engine." Furthermore, he was appalled once he finally achieved combustion. The engine "shook and trembled and rattled and clattered, spat oil, fire, smoke, and smell, and to a person who disliked machinery naturally, and who had been brought up to the fine elegance and perfection of fine horse carriages, it was revolting."

In early 1895, Maxim visited Colonel Albert Pope in Hartford which led to his being hired for the Motor Vehicle Division of the Pope Manufacturing Company. His vehicle was not ready in time for the Times-Herald race in November, but Maxim was able to get to Chicago and serve as an umpire. He rode with the Morris and Salom entry, the Electrobat II.

In 1899, with Maxim at the controls, the Pope Columbia, a gasoline-powered automobile, won the first closed-circuit automobile race in the U.S. at Branford, Connecticut. Columbia continued to produce gasoline cars until 1913, and was also a major manufacturer of early electric automobiles and trucks.

From 1902 through 1909, Maxim was largely focused on inventing, building, marketing, and selling firearm silencers. He also developed mufflers for internal combustion engines using much the same technology.

== Accomplishments ==
=== Firearm and auto industries ===
Hiram Percy Maxim is usually credited with inventing and selling the first commercially successful firearm silencer around 1902, receiving a patent for it on March 30, 1909. Maxim gave his device the trademarked name Maxim Silencer, and they were regularly advertised in sporting goods magazines. The muffler for internal combustion engines was developed in parallel with the firearm silencer by Maxim in the early 20th century, using many of the same techniques to provide quieter-running engines, and in many English-speaking countries automobile mufflers are called silencers.

=== Radio ===
He created the American Radio Relay League (ARRL) in 1914 as a response to the lack of an organized group of "relay" stations to pass messages via amateur radio. Relaying messages allowed them to be sent farther than any single station's reach at the time. He originally had the amateur call signs SNY, 1WH, 1ZM, (after World War I) 1AW, and later W1AW, which is now the ARRL Headquarters club station call sign. His rotary spark-gap transmitter "Old Betsy" has a place of honor at the ARRL Headquarters. The ARRL presents an annual award named for Maxim to a radio amateur and ARRL member under the age of 21.

=== Cinema ===
Maxim founded the Amateur Cinema League in New York in 1926; he was elected president. The Amateur Cinema League published a monthly journal, Movie Makers.

=== Literature ===
Maxim wrote the book Life's Place in the Cosmos, published in 1933, an overview of contemporary science that surmised life existed outside of earth; as well as two books published in 1936: A Genius in the Family: Sir Hiram Stevens Maxim Through a Small Son's Eyes an amusing account of his youth, and Horseless Carriage Days wherein he recounted his days as an automobile pioneer.

== Personal life and death ==
He married Josephine Hamilton, the daughter of the former Maryland Governor William T. Hamilton December 21, 1898, in Hagerstown, Maryland. They lived in Hartford, and had a son, Hiram Hamilton Maxim, and a daughter, Percy Hamilton Maxim, who married John Glessner Lee (grandson of John J. Glessner). The John J. Glessner House designed by Henry Hobson Richardson is now a Chicago landmark.

Percy Maxim Lee (1906–2002) was president of the League of Women Voters from 1950–1958 and was appointed by President Kennedy to the Consumer Advisory Council, which she later chaired. She advocated for debates between presidential candidates and testified in the U.S. Senate against Senator Joseph McCarthy in 1955.

Hiram Percy Maxim was on a trip by rail in February 1936 from his home in Hartford, Connecticut, to Flagstaff, Arizona, to visit the Lowell Observatory. He fell ill and was taken from the train to a hospital in La Junta, Colorado, where he died the following day, February 17, 1936. Hiram P. Maxim was buried in the Rose Hill Cemetery in Hagerstown, Maryland, in the Hamilton family plot belonging to his wife's family.

== In popular culture ==
Maxim's aforementioned autobiography of his youth, A Genius in the Family was adapted in 1946 into a comedy-drama film produced by Universal Pictures titled, So Goes My Love while the UK release used the same title as the book. Bobby Driscoll plays Maxim in the film, with Don Ameche and Myrna Loy playing his parents, Hiram Stephens Maxim and Jane Bidden Maxim.

== Patents ==
- U.S. patent 594,805: Motor vehicle (battery electric vehicle)
- U.S. patent 757,941: Motor vehicle running gear
- U.S. patent 772,571: Electric motor vehicle
- U.S. patent 845,106: Motor road vehicle
- U.S. patent 916,885: Silent Firearm Issued March 30, 1909.

== Books ==
- Life's Place in the Cosmos, New York: D. Appleton, 1933.
- A Genius in the Family, New York: Harper, 1936.
- Horseless Carriage Days, New York: Harper, 1936.

== Biography ==
- Schumacher, Alice Clink, Hiram Percy Maxim, Father of Amateur Radio, Great Falls, MT: Schumachers, 1970.
