= QST =

Amateur radio magazine

- October 2008 cover
- Editor: Becky Schoenfeld (W1BXY)
- Categories: Amateur radio
- Frequency: Monthly
- Circulation: 134,696
- Publisher: American Radio Relay League
- Founder: Hiram Percy Maxim; Clarence D. Tuska
- First issue: December 1915 (110 years ago)
- Country: United States
- Based in: Hartford, Connecticut, later Newington, Connecticut
- Language: English
- Website: www.arrl.org/qst
- ISSN: 0033-4812
- OCLC: 1623841

QST is a magazine for amateur radio enthusiasts, published by the American Radio Relay League (ARRL). It is a membership journal that is included with membership in the ARRL. The publisher claims that circulation of QST in the United States is higher than all other amateur radio-related publications in the United States combined. Although an exact number for circulation is not published by the American Radio Relay League, the organization claimed 158,238 members at the end of 2021, almost all of whom receive the magazine monthly, in addition to issues delivered to libraries and newsstands.

Its first issue was dated December 1915. QST suspended publication after September 1917 due to World War I, but has been in continuous publication since it resumed in May 1919.

== Magazine name ==
The magazine's name is the radio "Q signal" for "calling all stations" or "the following message is to be forwarded to all amateur stations".

== Content ==
QST includes projects for the amateur radio enthusiast, and pictures, articles, columns, and reports on ARRL affairs. Particular interest is given to amateur radio's role in emergency communications such as in the hours after the September 11 attacks and in Hurricane Katrina.

Supplemental content to the magazine is available on the ARRL website, including an abridged archive in PDF format, available to ARRL members, that spans all content dated 1915–2011.

As part of its centennial celebration in 2014, ARRL published two volumes of QST reprints from 1915 to 2013: One on Amateur Radio technology and the other on advertising.

Notable content includes a circuit in the April 1968 issue from Ronald Stordahl, the founder and current CEO of DigiKey (as of 2023).

== History ==
The first issue of the magazine was published in December 1915, with its first three issues financed by American Radio Relay League founder Hiram Percy Maxim and secretary Clarence D. Tuska, with an expectation that increased membership would finance its continued existence. In October 1916, the editors announced the formation of The QST Publishing Company, mostly to insulate Maxim and Tuska from possible litigation risks.

December 1915 front cover

Publication of QST was temporarily suspended after the September 1917 issue. In April 1917, the United States government, following its entrance into World War I, banned all amateur radio activities, and a large percentage of the magazine's subscribers had entered military service. The ban on amateur radio was lifted after the conclusion of the war. QST returned in May 1919 with no cover – billed as “ARRL special bulletin” – and only 8 pages long. At a meeting in New York on March 29, a group that included Maxim, Tuska, and nine others decided to finance its return in this form and make a plea for membership and subscription renewals.

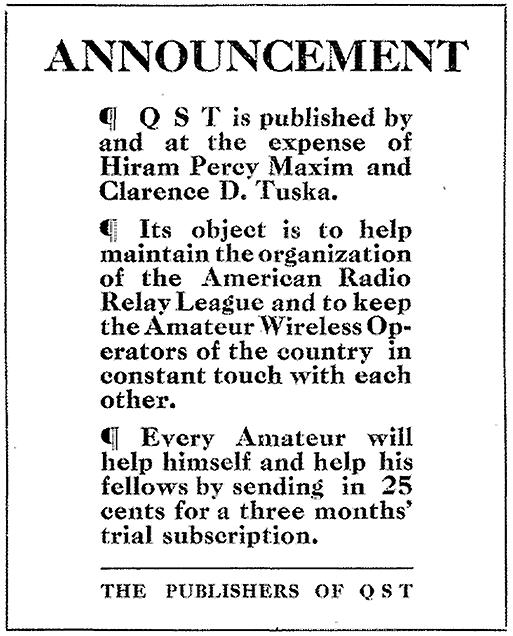
Announcement about the establishment of QST magazine that appeared in the debut December 1915 issue

The June 1919 issue, still without a cover, announced that the wartime ban on receiving had been lifted. Finally, in July 1919, QST resumed its previous format, although amateurs were not permitted back on the air until that fall, (Note: The amateur radio's return to air was delayed by U.S. military's attempt to make permanent its wartime control of radio communication.) when a supplement to the October 1919 issue proclaimed “BAN OFF”. By September 1920, QST was back up to 100 pages, a size not seen since April 1917.

Publication continued throughout World War II, despite amateur radio's repeated wartime hiatus by order of the U.S. government. During both wars, amateurs were in high demand as military radio operators, and QST's staff pitched in for the war effort.

== Administration ==
The current managing editor is Becky Schoenfeld (W1BXY).

Steve Ford (WB8IMY) retired as managing editor in September 2020.
