= American Radio Relay League =

American organization of amateur radio enthusiasts

- Abbreviation: ARRL
- Formation: April 6, 1914; 112 years ago
- Type: Non-profit organization
- Purpose: Advocacy, Education
- Headquarters: Newington, Connecticut; FN31pr
- Region served: United States
- Members: 120,000
- President: Rick Roderick, K5UR
- Main organ: Board of Directors
- Affiliations: International Amateur Radio Union
- Budget: US$14,000,000
- Staff: 120
- Website: www.arrl.org

The American Radio Relay League (ARRL) is the largest membership association of amateur radio enthusiasts in the United States. The ARRL is a non-profit organization and was co-founded on April 6, 1914, by Hiram Percy Maxim and Clarence D. Tuska of Hartford, Connecticut. The ARRL represents the interests of amateur radio operators before federal regulatory bodies, provides technical advice and assistance to amateur radio enthusiasts, supports a number of educational programs and sponsors emergency communications service throughout the country. The ARRL has approximately 161,000 members. In addition to members in the US, the organization claims over 7,000 members in other countries. The ARRL publishes many books and a monthly membership journal called QST. In 2023, the ARRL reported a significant increase in new amateur radio licensees in the United States, with over 30,000 new licenses issued for the first time since 2014.

The ARRL is the primary representative organization of amateur radio operators to the US government. It performs this function by lobbying the US Congress and the Federal Communications Commission. The ARRL is also the international secretariat of the International Amateur Radio Union, which performs a similar role internationally, advocating for amateur radio interests before the International Telecommunication Union and the World Administrative Radio Conferences.

The organization is governed by a member-elected, volunteer Board of Directors. Each director serves a three-year term and represents the members within their particular region of the country. The national headquarters facilities are located in Newington, Connecticut. Along with the administrative headquarters, the 7-acre (2.8 ha) site is home to amateur radio station W1AW. The ARRL Field Organization carries out local and regional activities across the United States.

== Governance ==
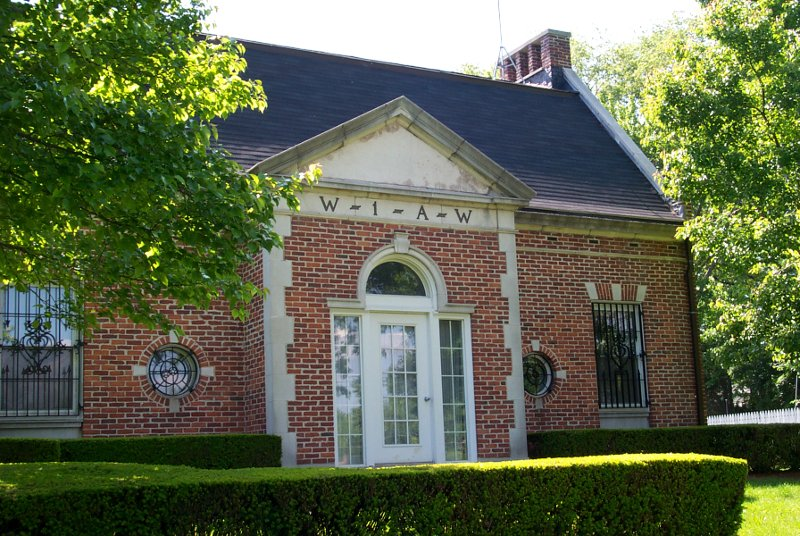
ARRL W1AW building in Newington, Connecticut, US

The ARRL is governed by a member-elected, volunteer Board of Directors. The organization divides its membership into 15 Divisions, each representing a portion of the country. One Director and one vice-director are elected by the members of each Division to serve a three-year term. Director elections are staggered so that one-third of the Directors and Vice Directors are up for election each year. The Board of Directors manages policy direction for the organization as a whole. The Board of Directors appoints an executive committee, led by the President and consisting of members of the ARRL Board of Directors, to make policy decisions between full Board meetings. ARRL's officers manage day-to-day administrative operation of the organization, led by the Chief Executive Officer. These paid officers hold their positions as long as the Board of Directors approve but have no vote on the Board.

Local and regional operational activities of the American Radio Relay League are carried out through its Field Organization. The organization divides the 15 Divisions into 71 separate geographic regions called Sections. Each Section has a similar team of one elected, volunteer Section Manager and several volunteer positions. Section Managers are elected by the members living within the section for a two-year term. The Section Manager appoints a team of volunteers. A Section Manager may optionally appoint one or more Assistant Section Managers.

An important function of the ARRL Field Organization is organizing emergency communications in the event of civil or natural disaster. The ARRL's Amateur Radio Emergency Service (ARES) program is organized through the ARRL Field Organization. Each Section of the Field Organization has an appointed Section Emergency Coordinator. The ARES organization supports training, establishes Memorandums of Understanding (MOU) with governmental and relief agencies, and organizes regular practice exercises.

ARES has provided essential supplemental emergency communications innumerable times throughout the league's history. In 1989, hundreds of amateurs responded to the Loma Prieta earthquake in the San Francisco Bay area putting in over 3000 volunteer hours in the first week. In 2005, ARES, with hundreds of volunteer amateur radio operators, provided key communications assistance to recovery organizations and officials coordinating Hurricane Katrina disaster relief.

Over 2,000 Amateur Radio clubs are members of the ARRL Affiliated Club Program.

== History ==
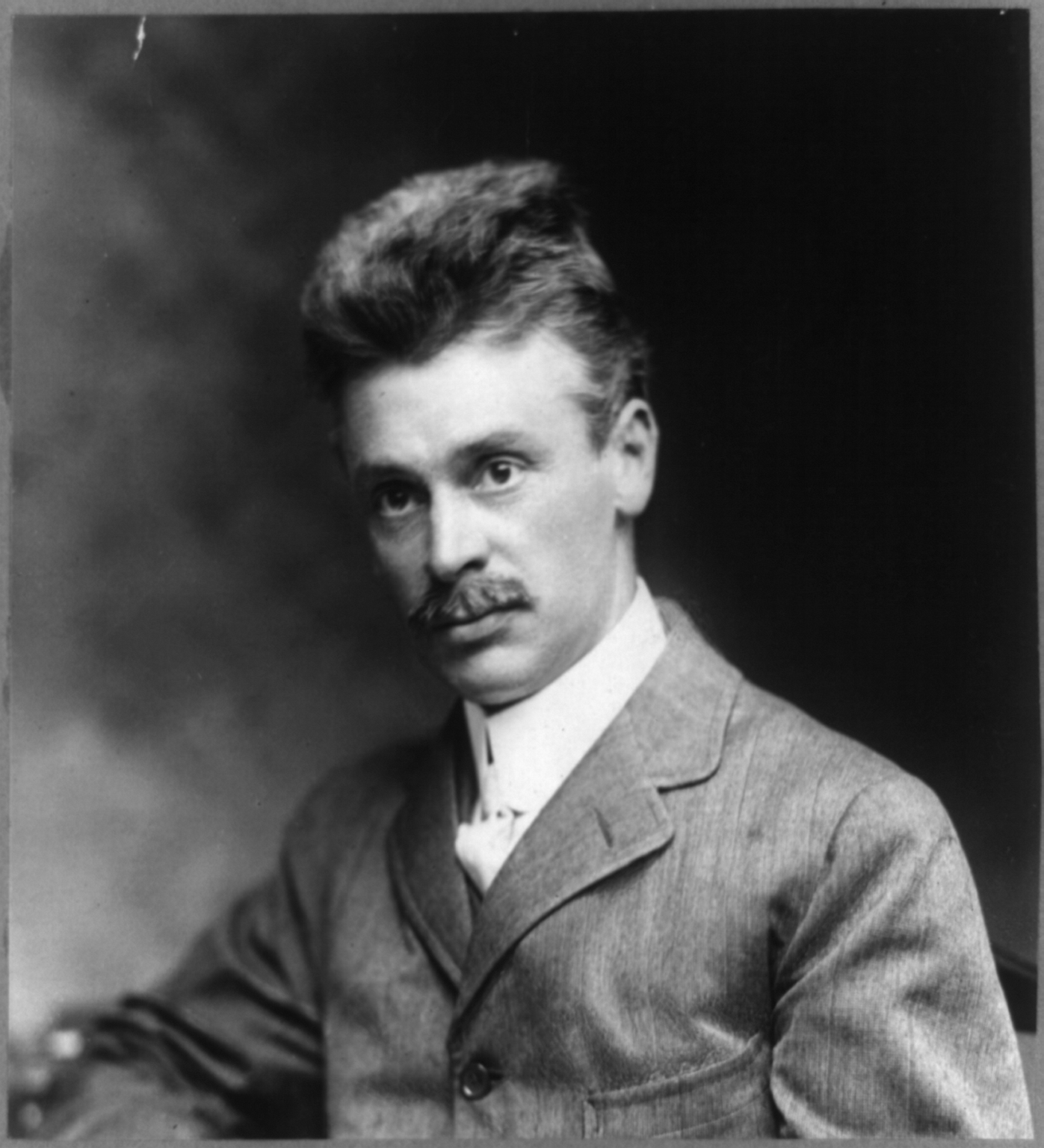
Hiram Percy Maxim, co-founder (president) of the ARRL, c. 1914.

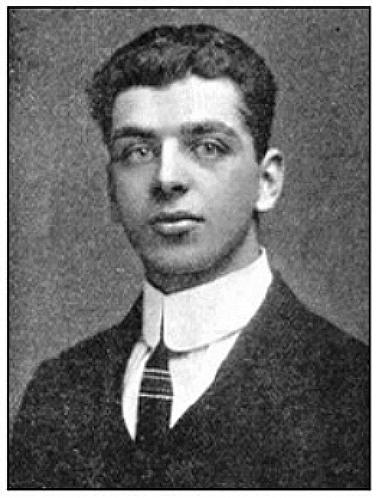
Clarence Tuska, co-founder (secretary) of the ARRL, 1916

=== 1914–1920 ===
In 1914, Hiram Percy Maxim of Hartford, Connecticut, was a prominent businessman, engineer, and inventor (notably of the Maxim Silencer). He was also an active radio amateur, with one of the best-equipped stations in the Hartford area. One night in April he attempted to send a message to another ham in Springfield, Massachusetts. He had a one-kilowatt station (call 1WH), and Springfield was only 30 miles (48 km) away, well within his normal range. He was unable to make contact, and remembering that he knew another ham in Windsor Locks, about halfway, he asked him to relay the message. At that time, the maximum reliable range of a station was a few hundred miles, and so Maxim realized that a formally organized relay system would be of tremendous use to amateurs.

Maxim was a member of the Radio Club of Hartford, and he presented a plan for the organization of an "American Radio Relay League" at its April 1914 meeting. The club agreed to sponsor the development of such an organization. Maxim and Clarence D. Tuska, the secretary of the Hartford Radio Club, developed application forms and sent them out to every amateur station they could think of. By September 1914 they had over 230 stations on the roster.

In early 1915, disagreements began to surface as to the role of the Hartford Radio Club in the new organization, and in February the ARRL split off from the club and incorporated under Connecticut law. Finances were shaky, and most of the income came from sales of booklets, maps and message blanks. By March 1915, there were 600 stations on the roster, and due to improvements in equipment and operating ability, some of the better stations were claiming communication ranges of up to a thousand miles. It was apparent that the ARRL now needed some kind of bulletin to stay in touch with its members. Maxim and Tuska agreed to personally finance it, and in December 1915 the first, 16-page issue of QST was sent free to all members. Further issues would be supplied through subscription at $1 per year.

In 1916, with ARRL membership nearing a thousand, Maxim set up six trunk lines of relay stations, both east–west and north–south, and individual managers were appointed. Messages were now being relayed over longer and longer distances, and in February 1917 a message was sent from New York to Los Angeles and an answer received in one hour and twenty minutes.

In 1917, the ARRL was reorganized to a more formal organization. A constitution was adopted, twelve directors and four officers were elected (including President Maxim and Secretary Tuska), and membership was opened to anyone interested in radio. No sooner had this happened than all amateurs received a letter from the Department of Commerce ordering them off the air and to dismantle all antennas, because the United States had entered World War I.

During the war the ARRL facilitated the recruitment of amateurs into communications positions with the armed services, but had little else to do since all civilian experimentation with radio equipment was prohibited. In November 1918 the Armistice was signed, but Congress introduced bills to put all radio operations in the United States under control of the Navy. The ARRL strongly opposed the bills. Maxim testified before Congressional committees and the League organized an effective grass roots campaign with thousands of individuals contacting their congressmen in opposition. The bills were defeated, and in April 1919 amateurs were permitted to put up antennas again, but only for receiving.

Meanwhile, the League needed reorganization. A financing plan consisting of selling bonds to members was adopted and about $7500 was raised. QST was purchased from its owner, Clarence Tuska. ARRL continued to lobby Congress for the resumption of transmitting privileges, and after a number of protests and appeals, amateur radio was fully restored in November 1919.

=== 1920–1964 ===
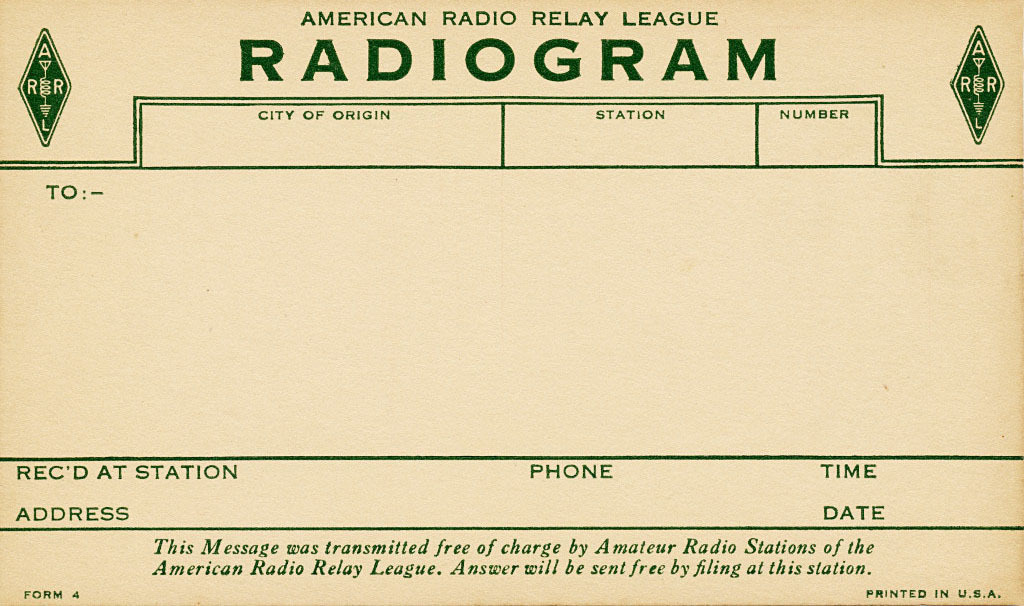
ARRL radiogram delivery postcard, c. 1925

The 1920s saw tremendous technical growth in radio. Pushed both by wartime demands and by the growing commercialization of radio, equipment rapidly improved. The use of spark gap technology quickly disappeared as the more efficient continuous wave system of generating radio-frequency energy and transmitting Morse Code became standard. In 1923 a two-way contact between Connecticut and France bridged the Atlantic Ocean for the first time.

With government uncertainty as to how to allocate both commercial and amateur frequencies, the ARRL kept discipline in amateur ranks so that spectrum was not unnecessarily occupied. They worked with Washington and the result was that amateurs received the orderly series of harmonic frequency bands that they largely hold today (originally 1.8, 3.5, 7, 14, 28, and 56 MHz; other bands have since been added and the 56 MHz allocation was changed to 50 MHz).

Other activities during this time included transcontinental relays to quickly move messages across the United States, communications assistance in several emergencies, and encouragement for an amateur radio operator on an Arctic expedition of Donald B. MacMillan—perhaps the first beginnings of DXpeditions. The League also began to act in an advisory capacity for the American delegations at international radio conferences. In 1925 the International Amateur Radio Union was formed, and it remains headquartered at Newington. The long-running Frankford Radio Club (W3BKX) was founded around 1927 and affiliated with ARRL in 1930.

In the 1930s the Great Depression took its toll on development. Hiram Percy Maxim died in 1936. His callsign W1AW was licensed to the League and remains in use as the first-ever Memorial Station. In 1937 the DXCC Award, for working 100 countries, was established, and it still is the premier achievement in amateur radio. Operators, often under the ARRL Emergency Corps, helped at numerous disasters. The League's QST magazine acted as a forum for experimenters in voice, television, and very high frequency work.

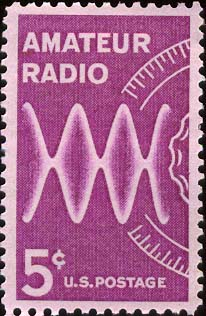
US postage stamp for 50th anniversary of ARRL (1964)

During World War II, US amateurs were again told to leave the air. The ARRL developed the government-approved War Emergency Radio Service, a Civil Defense system. Thousands of League members, and many thousands more who received technical training through its publications, served in the conflict. In late 1945 the bands began to reopen. The end of the war brought a tremendous expansion of amateur radio as large amounts of war surplus equipment was available, many recently trained operators became active, and experiments began in such newly developed modes as single sideband and microwaves.

The 1950s saw the continued development of amateur radio and consequent growth of the ARRL. New civil defense systems and procedures were developed by the League, including regular communications between isolated service members and their families. Equipment rapidly improved, although there was some trouble with television interference. The ARRL and many of its members cooperated with scientists during the International Geophysical Year in 1957, measuring the effects of solar activity on propagation in the VHF band.

A controversial idea was originated in 1961 when the League encouraged "incentive licensing", which sought reversion to the principle that higher levels of license privileges should require higher levels of demonstrated knowledge and CW skill but took away some amateur privileges until licensees requalified at higher levels; "incentives" are still in effect and only holders of the highest class of license (Amateur Extra) maintain all amateur privileges. By 1964 the positive influence of the ARRL was so evident that the United States issued a commemorative postage stamp on its 50th anniversary. As the League prepared for the future a new headquarters building was opened at Newington.

=== 1965–present ===
In May, June, and July 2024, various ARRL online systems (including the Logbook of the World and its educational website) went unavailable. The organization didn't admit that the outage was caused by ransomware until it filed legally-mandated notifications of the data breach on July 11, more than two months after the breach started on May 3.

In August 2024, the organization confirmed that it paid a million dollar ransom to resolve the malware attack.

=== Presidential terms ===
Sixteen radio amateurs have led the ARRL as president.

Name	Call Sign	Years
Hiram Percy Maxim	W1AW	1914–1936
E.C. Woodruff	W8CMP	1936–1940
G.W. Bailey	W2KH	1940–1952
G.L. Dosland	WØTSN	1952–1962
Herbert Hoover, Jr.	W6ZH	1962–1966
R.W. Denniston	WØDX	1966–1972
H.J. Dannals	W2TUK/W2HD	1972–1982
V.C. Clark	W4KFC	1982–1983
C.L. Smith	WØBWJ	1983–1984
L.E. Price	W4RA	1984–1992
George Wilson	W4OYI	1992–1995
Rod Stafford	W6ROD	1995–2000
Jim Haynie	W5JBP	2000–2006
Joel Harrison	W5ZN	2006–2010
Kay Craigie	N3KN	2010–2016
Rick Roderick	K5UR	2016–present

== Regulatory advocacy ==
The ARRL has opposed regulatory support for Broadband over Power Lines, arguing that the power lines will radiate interfering radio energy, impeding amateur radio activities. The League has filed several interference reports with the FCC. The ARRL sued the FCC, claiming that the FCC violated the Administrative Procedure Act in creating its rules pertaining to BPL. On April 25, 2008, a US Court of Appeals agreed with the ARRL that the FCC violated the APA, especially by redacting data from the public that could have shed doubt on the FCC's decision. "It is one thing for the Commission to give notice and make available for comment the studies on which it relied in formulating the rule while explaining its non-reliance on certain parts," D.C. Circuit Judge Judith Rogers wrote. "It is quite another thing to provide notice and an opportunity for comment on only those parts of the studies that the Commission likes best."

On April 11, 2025, ARRL filed comments in response to the FCC's request for public input on removing unnecessary regulatory burdens. The comments included:

- Deleting the LF and VHF/UHF symbol (baud) rate and bandwidth limitations
- Modernizing 80/75-meter sub-band divisions
- Deleting amplifier drive limitations
- Deleting and replacing obsolete digital code limitations Implement changes to third-party rules adopted internationally at WRC-03
- Updating and modernizing entry-level technician class license privileges
- Removing non-current personal information in amateur ULS records
- Deleting obsolete identification requirements for special call signs
- Deleting obsolete paper license replacement provisions

== Services ==
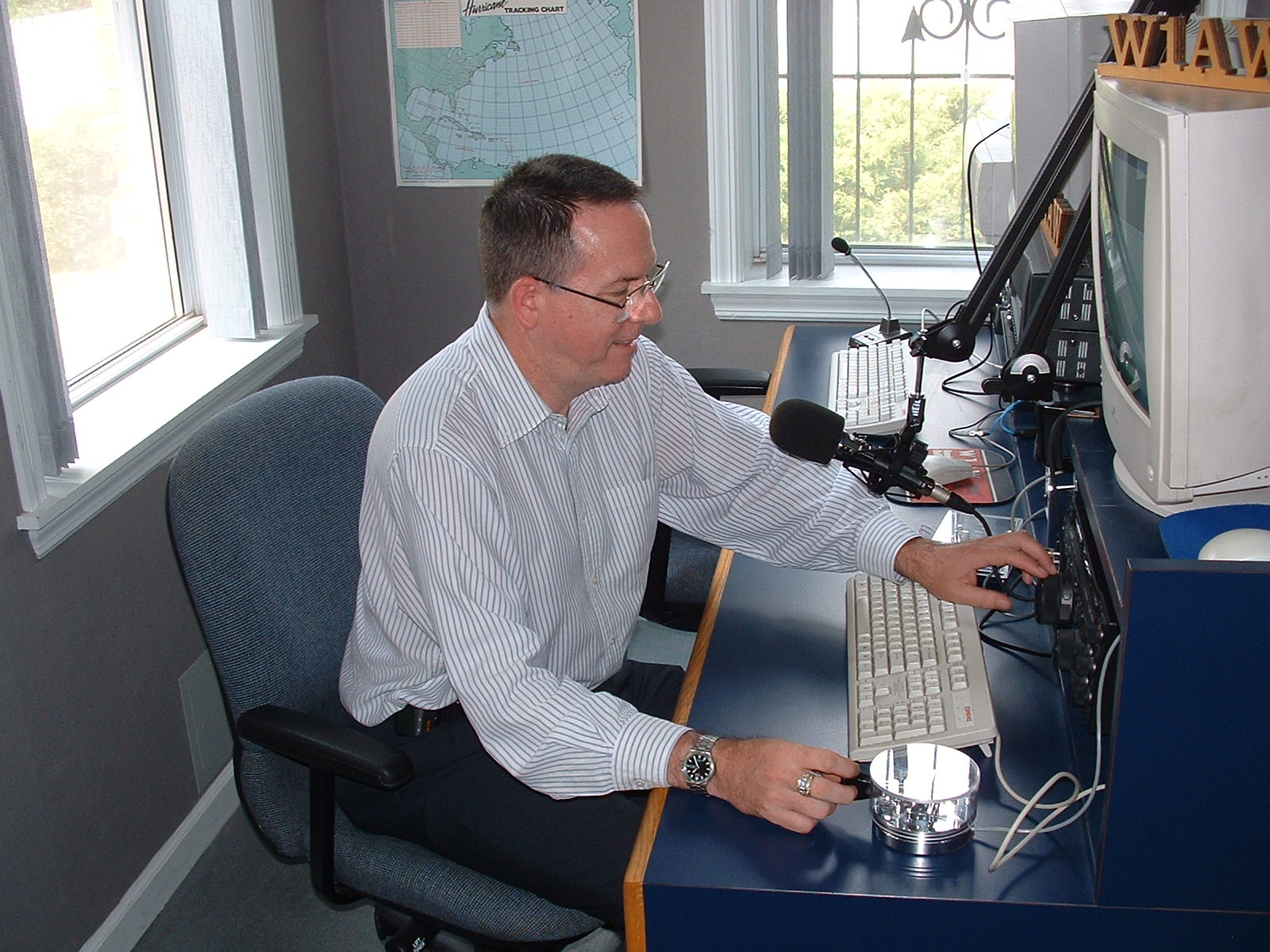
One of the many guest operators at W1AW's Studio One. (2004)

The American Radio Relay League offers several services to members that support their on-air operations. For members with an interest in DXing, the organization operates both incoming and out-going QSL bureaus for the exchange of QSL cards with stations in other countries. Staff at the organization headquarters maintain and operates station W1AW, the Hiram Percy Maxim Memorial Station, as a living memorial to the "Father of Organized Amateur Radio". The W1AW station is used for regular Morse code training transmissions for those wishing to learn and also broadcasts a variety of bulletins of interest to radio amateurs. The ARRL/VEC (Volunteer Examiner Coordinator) sponsors amateur radio license examinations for the three classes of U.S. amateur license. License classes and examinations are held in various locations throughout the year. Although the FCC currently recognizes 14 different organizations as VECs, the VEC sponsored by the ARRL oversees about two-thirds of all U.S. amateur radio license examinations.

=== Publications ===
The ARRL provides dozens of publications and journals to both members and non-members. QST is the organization's monthly membership journal, named after a Morse code Q signal that means "calling all stations". The organization also publishes two bimonthly magazines of special interest: QEX for radio electronics experimenters, and the National Contest Journal for contesting enthusiasts. The ARRL publishes various technical books and online courses. Members of the organization also have access to a special Members Only section of the ARRL web site that includes technical documents, expanded product reviews of amateur radio equipment, expanded contesting information, and a searchable database of all league publications. A flagship annual publication, The Radio Amateur's Handbook, has been published since 1926. The ARRL also publishes a series of manuals designed to assist interested persons in obtaining an amateur radio license or upgrading to a higher class of license.

=== Contests ===
The ARRL sponsors numerous amateur radio contests throughout the year with the biggest of these being November Sweepstakes and the International DX Contest. Other contests and sponsored operating events include Straight Key Night, VHF Sweepstakes, UHF Contest, and 10 GHz and Up Contest. The ARRL also participates as a Headquarters station for the IARU HF World Championship. Field Day is an annual event organized by the ARRL that includes both a competitive element as well as an emphasis on emergency communications readiness and the promotion of amateur radio.

== Controversy ==
Criticisms of ARRL have included its support for less strict licensing requirements in the 2000s, which opponents consider a "dumbing down" of amateur radio or making it more like CB radio, moves allegedly made to gain additional membership. Other critics have felt almost the opposite, however, arguing that the ARRL was slow to lobby for the removal or the easing of the Morse code proficiency requirements of the various license classes, a "conservatism" keeping otherwise qualified people out of amateur radio and thus threatening its future.

Other critics have cited ARRL's support for segmentation of the HF amateur bands in the U.S. by bandwidth, rather than by mode, which some have claimed gives preference to users of the Winlink system and manufacturer-specific proprietary modes such as Pactor 3, DSTAR, and Wide-coverage Internet Repeater Enhancement System (WIRES). Regulation by bandwidth favors these proprietary technologies at the expense of narrowband and open-standard digital modes (such as JT65, PSK31, RTTY, and CW).

An ARRL decision on November 14, 2017 to censure a member of its board of directors drew strong criticism from many Amateur Radio operators. Numerous operators expressed concern that this decision profoundly undermines the principles of representational democracy and of openness and transparency. A December 2017 white paper critical of the ARRL's actions was published online by CQ. This censure was rescinded by the ARRL Board of Directors at its next board meeting, in July 2019.

== Elser-Mathes Cup ==
The Elser-Mathes Cup was created in 1928 by U.S. Amateurs Fred Johnson Elser (W6FB/W7OX) and Stanley M. Mathes (7OE/K1CY) to be awarded for the "First Amateur Two-Way Communication Earth & Mars". The cup is a Philippine Igorot wood carving, a bowl supported by two standing figures.

== Organization ==
In the American Radio Relay League (ARRL) and the Radio Amateurs of Canada (RAC), the Section Manager is an elected volunteer who implements and manages programs in the section. The Section Manager is elected by the members of the organization who reside in the section and holds office for a two-year term. There are no term limits.

For each of the section's activities, the Section Manager appoints individuals to oversee the activities. These individuals are collectively referred to as the cabinet.

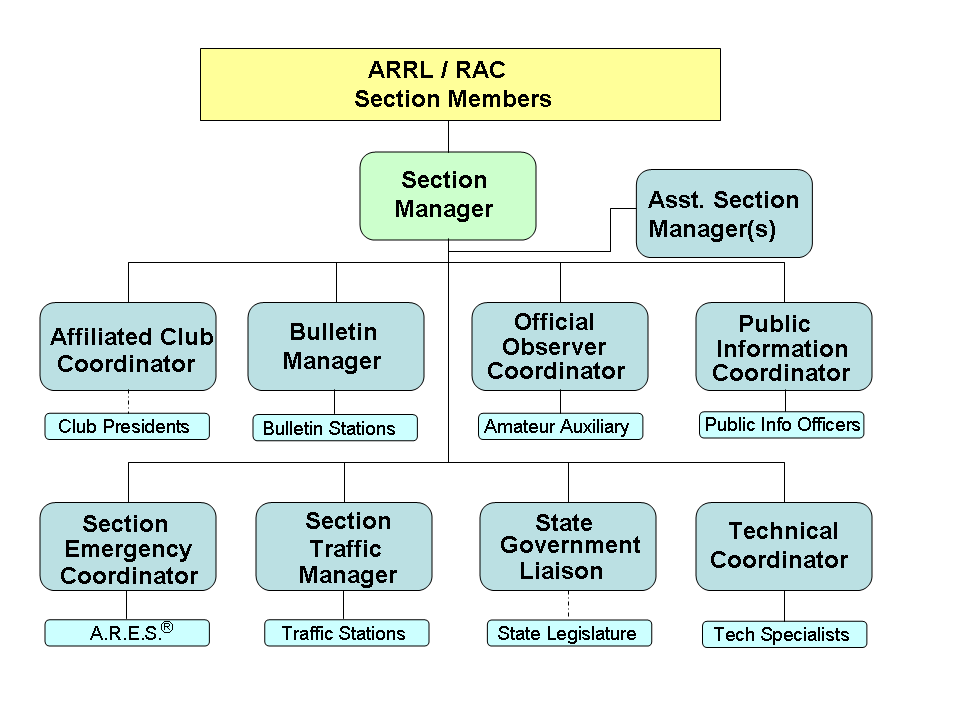
ARRL / RAC Section Organization Chart

Cabinet positions include:

- Assistant Section Managers
- Affiliated Club Coordinator
- Bulletin Manager
- Official Observer Coordinator
- Public Information Coordinator
- Section Emergency Coordinator
- Section Traffic Manager
- Section Youth Coordinator
- State Government Liaison
- Technical Coordinator

The Section Manager also appoints volunteers to serve within these program areas. The volunteers in any given Section serve at the pleasure of the Section Manager. The Section Manager also assists members with questions, issues or problems dealing with the organization's products and services; maintains liaison with the frequency coordinating body in the jurisdiction; maintains a relationship with the local field office of the Federal Communications Commission (FCC)(US only), and maintains communications with members in the section via email bulletins, web pages, and personal visits to Amateur Radio club meetings, hamfests and conventions.

There are currently 71 sections in the ARRL, (United States) and 12 sections in the RAC (Canada).

An Affiliated Club Coordinator is the assistant to the Section Manager for radio club matters. One ACC is appointed in each section by the Section Manager to encourage club affiliation with the national organization on a section-wide basis.

The Section Traffic Manager is appointed by the Section Manager to supervise and coordinate traffic handling efforts within the National Traffic System and the section.

The Section Emergency Coordinator is the assistant to the Section Manager for amateur radio emergency communications preparedness. The SEC is appointed by the Section Manager.

== See also ==
- Amateur Radio Emergency Service
- ARRL International Humanitarian Award
- International Amateur Radio Union
- National Traffic System
- Radio Amateur Civil Emergency Service
- W1AW
- Radio Amateurs of Canada
