= Clarence D. Tuska =

American radio experimenter and operator (1896–1985)

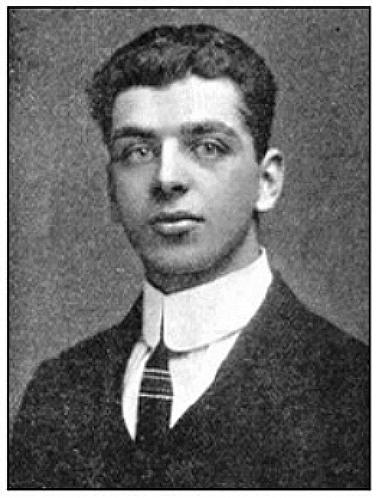
- Tuska in 1916
- Born: August 15, 1896; New York City, U.S.
- Died: June 30, 1985 (aged 88); Cranbury, New Jersey, U.S.
- Occupations: Radio engineer, patent attorney, author
- Employer: Radio Corporation of America
- Known for: Amateur and professional radio
- Spouse: Edith Tuska
- Children: 2

Clarence Denton "C. D." Tuska (August 15, 1896 – June 30, 1985) was an early radio experimenter and amateur operator, who also became one of the first radio receiver manufacturers. He is best known as the co-founder, along with Hiram Percy Maxim, of the American Radio Relay League (ARRL). He was also the original editor and owner of the amateur radio publication QST, which he subsequently sold to the ARRL in 1919, as part of his reorientation toward professional activities within the radio industry.

== Early life ==
Tuska was born in New York City, the only child of Ida Anna Ruddell and David Tuska, and until 1909 lived in Nyack, New York, when his family moved to Hartford, Connecticut. After graduating from high school, he attended the local Trinity College (class of 1919, although he did not receive his Bachelor of Science degree until 1939).

== Amateur radio activities ==
Tuska had an early interest in radio communication (then known as "wireless telegraphy") and experimentation. In 1908, while living in Nyack, a New York City cousin helped him construct a small radio transmitter, and after moving to Hartford the next year he constructed progressively more powerful stations. Radio transmitters in the United States were not licensed at this time, so he initially operated using the self-assigned call letters SNT, which stood for "Southern New England-Tuska".

Around 1910, while in the ninth grade, Tuska began earning "pocket money" by selling rubber band-powered model aeroplanes on consignment through the Harris Parker Toy Store. After these sales started to decline, he next constructed a simple crystal radio receiver, also offered through consignment at the toy store. Inventor Hiram Percy Maxim took this set home to test, but soon returned it, and the store owner incorrectly informed Tuska that Maxim had said it "didn't work". This upset Tuska, so with a friend, William Ball, he traveled, unannounced, to Maxim's house to investigate. After clarifying that Maxim actually just needed better quality equipment, Tuska and Ball arranged for ordering the appropriate components, which were used to construct a set that "gave satisfactory service for a number of years". Both Maxim and Tuska became prominent local amateur radio enthusiasts, with the two forming an informal "father-foster-son relationship", as Tuska's father was deceased.

After the United States enacted the Radio Act of 1912, all radio transmitters now were required to be licensed, and in early 1913 Tuska was issued a standard Amateur license with the call sign 1WD. (Note: The "1" in 1WD's call sign indicated that the station was located in the first Radio Inspection district.) On January 14, 1914, local amateurs founded the Hartford Radio Club, and Tuska became the club's secretary. In the fall of 1915, he began teaching a radio principles class at the local YMCA Tuska also began experimenting with radiotelephony, using an arc transmitter of his own design, which employed tungsten electrodes to make audio transmissions. In March 1916 it was reported that he was broadcasting semi-regular phonograph concerts, at a time when virtually all radio transmissions were still employing the dots-and-dashes of Morse code.

=== Founding of the American Radio Relay League and QST magazine ===
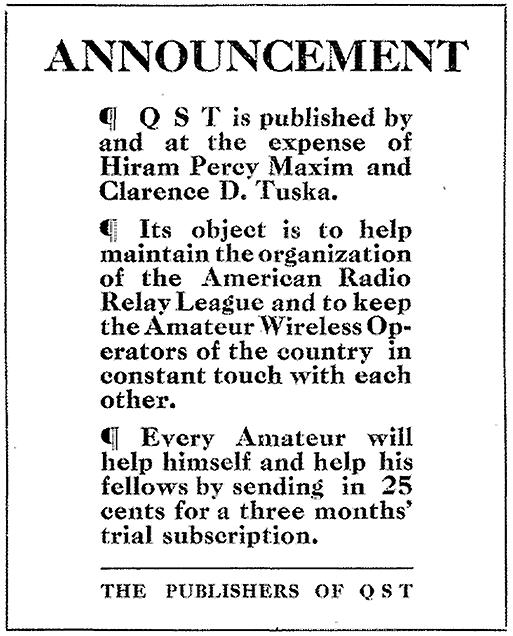
Announcement about the establishment of QST magazine that appeared in the debut December 1915 issue

Under the provisions of the Radio Act of 1912, most amateur stations were restricted to operating on a wavelength of 200 meters (1500 kHz), which effectively limited their transmitting range to about 25 miles (40 kilometers). In the spring of 1914, Hiram Percy Maxim began promoting the idea of a national organization of amateurs that would transmit messages over greater distances by organizing relays. This resulted in Maxim's incorporation of the American Radio Relay League (ARRL), with Maxim as president, and Tuska the organization's secretary. At this time Tuska also resigned from the Hartford Radio Club.

Communications throughout the new league proved difficult, so Tuska suggested the establishment of a magazine to promote and coordinate the organization's activities, and, following advice from an uncle, founded QST magazine. Although QST acted as the official publication of the ARRL, initially the magazine was personally owned by Tuska, who became its first editor. The publication was prepared at his mother's house, with the first issue dated December 1915.

One of the provisions of the Radio Act of 1912 was that, in a limited number of cases where it was shown to be of value, amateurs could be issued "Special Amateur" licenses, that permitted operation in the band of wavelengths from 600 to 200 meters (500 to 1500 kHz). Maxim successfully convinced government regulators that relay work fell into this category, and in the spring of 1915 Tuska was upgraded to a Special Amateur license, with the call sign 1ZT, which permitted operation on the standard relay wavelength of 425 meters (706 kHz). (Note: The "Z" in 1ZT's call sign reflected the fact that the station was operating under a Special Amateur license.)

== World War I ==
In April 1917, the entry of the United States into World War I resulted in all civilian radio stations being shut down for the duration of the conflict. Despite this, Tuska hoped to continue publishing QST, but with all amateur stations now silenced, and large numbers of their operators entering military service, this proved impossible. The magazine suspended publication after its September 1917 issue, and Tuska applied for and received a commission as a Lieutenant in the U.S. Army's Signal Corps. Originally posted in Washington, D.C., he next established a radio training school at the Ellington Airfield near Houston, Texas. He was later transferred to the radio school at the Firing center at Camp McClellan in Alabama. After the end of the war, he returned to Hartford.

== Initial professional work ==
In late 1919, the government ban on amateur radio stations was lifted, and Tuska was issued a standard amateur license with the call sign 1AY. However, as the family bread-winner — in the 1920 U.S. census, he was listed as "head of household", living with his mother and grandmother Annie E. Ruddell, who were both widowed — he became focused on earning a living, so he turned to the professional side of the radio industry.

At the same time an effort was being made to revive the dormant ARRL, and an eight-page "midget issue" of QST was published in April 1919, where it was announced that $7,500 in 5% two-year bonds were being sold in order to restart the league. Approximately $4,700 of these funds were allocated for purchasing QST from Tuska and paying several months of outstanding printing fees. The fundraising proved successful, and monthly publication of QST resumed in June under the new ownership.

=== C. D. Tuska Company ===
In 1920, with Maxim's help, Tuska established the C. D. Tuska Company in Hartford. After an unsuccessful attempt to market an electrical experimenter's kit, he later began offering radio equipment, eventually manufacturing radio receivers for amateurs and experimenters. As part of this effort, he obtained a license to use the Armstrong regenerative circuit patent, which was an important advance in radio reception. Although Tuska's company initially was a minor concern oriented toward the relatively small amateur radio market, in 1922 a nationwide increase in the number of broadcasting stations caused an explosive growth in the radio industry. Moreover, although Tuska's Armstrong license only covered "amateur and experimental" offering (in contrast to the "commercial" rights held by Westinghouse Electric & Manufacturing Company), a series of court rulings later clarified that radio receiver sales to the general public, for picking up broadcasting stations, was included as part of the "amateur and experimental" rights.

As a result of rapidly expanding demand, in late March 1922 it was announced that there were plans to increase the company work staff from 35 to 125 persons. By early June, it became necessary to move into an even larger factory, with the staff now numbering 175. In 1923 Tuska, in conjunction with Robert Miner, developed a modification of the original regeneration circuit, which was called the "Superdyne".

Eventually demand outpaced the company's capabilities, so it began farming out some activities to other concerns, including the A. C. Gilbert Company in New Haven. Westinghouse soon sued to eliminate this practice, claiming it violated the non-transferable provisions of the rights granted by the Armstrong license. In late 1925 it was announced that the C. D. Tuska Company was being acquired by another radio manufacturer. This turned out to be the Atwater Kent company, which required an Armstrong license in order to fend off its own legal entanglements with Westinghouse.

Tuska Radio Advertisements

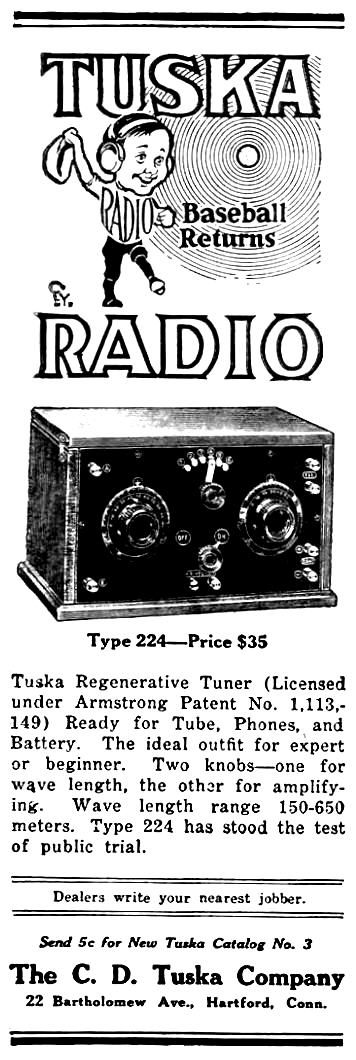
October 1922

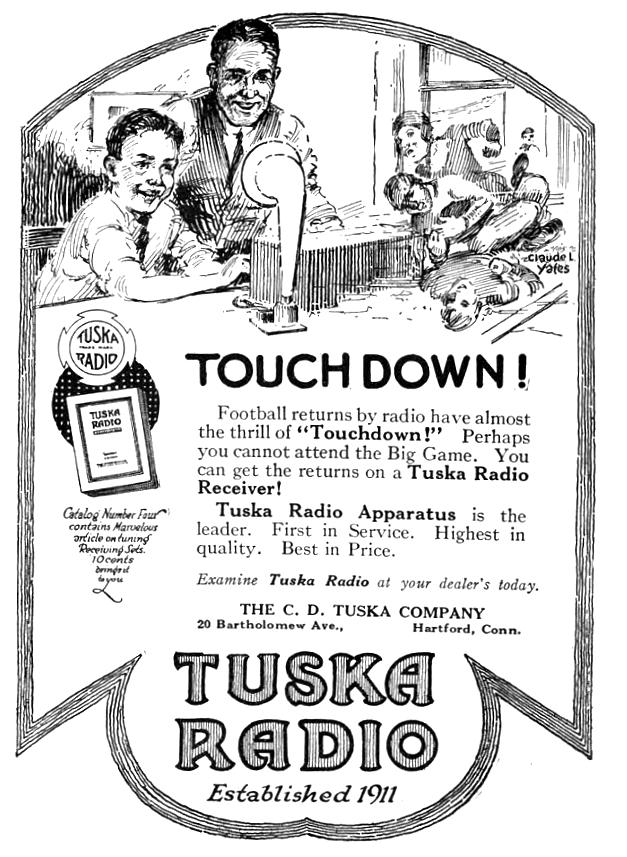
November 1922

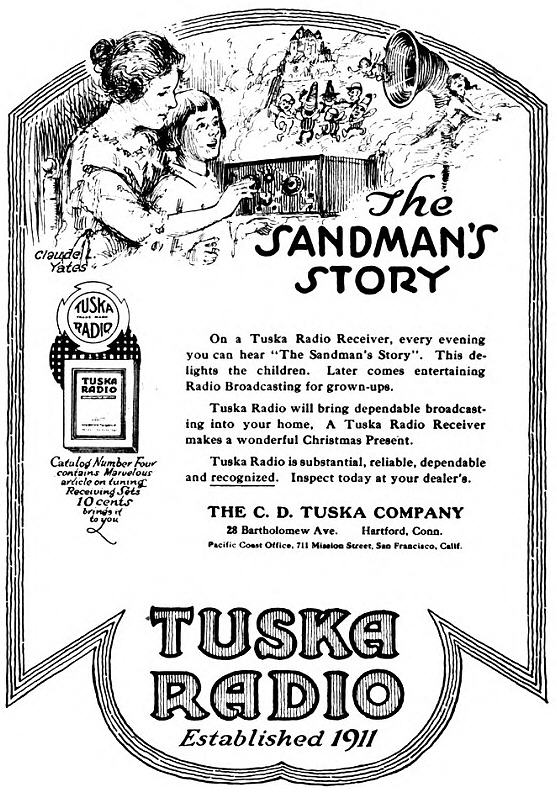
December 1922

=== Radio station WQB ===
In August 1921, the C. D. Tuska Company was issued a license for a Limited Commercial radio station with the call letters WQB, which was located at Tuska's home at 136 Oakland Terrace. The station was used to investigate developing radiotelephones for two-way mobile communication, and an August 1921 report noted the successful test of "a full-fledged wireless outfit in the rear of [Fire Chief John C. Moran's] Marmon touring car".

WQB was also one of the first post-World War I stations to conduct regular entertainment broadcasts, although at the time the station received its initial (and only) license in August 1921 there were no regulations in the United States defining broadcasting, so WQB was never formally classified as being a broadcasting station. By February 1922, it was reported that the station was transmitting on 360 meters (833 kHz), and Tuska had "just completed a 'broadcasting' room" studio. The most ambitious programs were twice-a-week evening broadcasts from the Capitol Theater, featuring organ recitals by Walter Dawley. But Tuska soon suspended most of WQB's broadcasts, with the explanation that he "was obliged to discontinue broadcasting as he needed to devote all his time to the activities of the C. D. Tuska Co." Although there were occasional reports of additional broadcasts as late as April, regular operations had ceased, and WQB was formally deleted on June 24, 1922.

== Later life ==
The remainder of Tuska's working life was in the radio field.

In March 1922, he participated in the establishment of the Hartford Courant's new broadcasting station, WDAK, even loaning the transmitting tubes formerly used at WQB in order to help the newspaper start operations. After the sale of the C. D. Tuska Company to Atwater Kent, he began working in that concern's patent office, earning a law degree from LaSalle Extension University in 1934. The next year he joined the Radio Corporation of America, where he became Director of Patent Operations in 1947. He became an expert in the field, authoring books that included Patent Notes for Engineers in 1956, Inventors and Inventions in 1957 and Accounting and Tax Aspects of Patents and Research (with J. A. McFadden) in 1960, as well as eight Journal of the Franklin Institute articles, including "So, You Want To Be an Inventor".

In 1974, following the death of his wife Edith, Tuska moved from Princeton to Hightstown, New Jersey. At the time of his death in 1985, he was living in Cranbury, New Jersey. His Trinity College obituary reported that during his life he received about twenty patents, and his memberships included the Institute of Electrical and Electronics Engineers, the Philadelphia Patent Law Office, and the Old Guard of Princeton.

In 1982, Tuska was inducted as the second member of the American Radio Relay League's Hall of Fame, and in 2001 he was included, as "Co-founder, ARRL", in the inaugural class of CQ magazine's "Amateur Radio Hall of Fame".
