= Volunteer Examiner Coordinator =

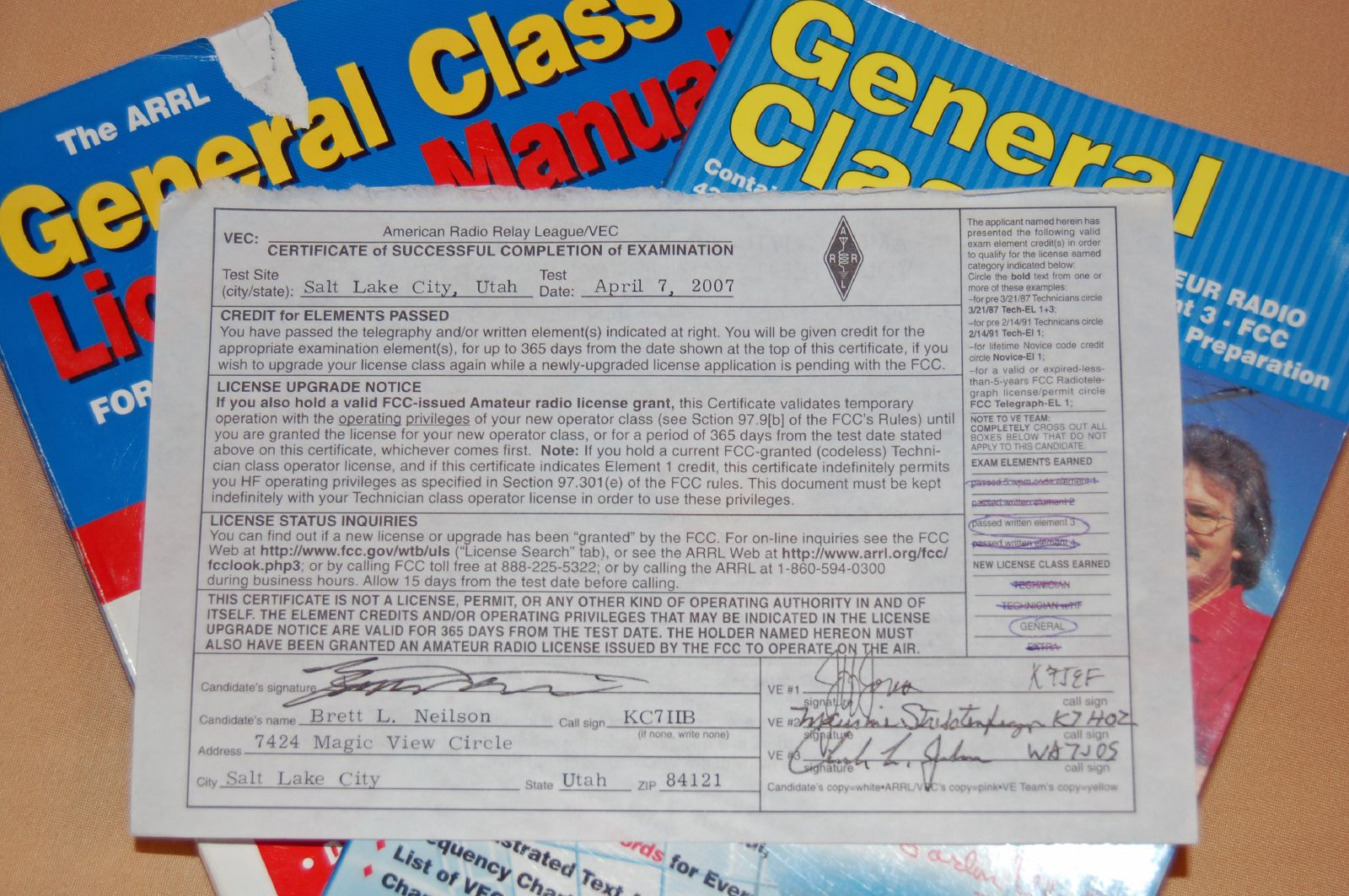
Certificate of Successful Completion of Examination (CSCE)

A Volunteer Examiner Coordinator is an organization that has been authorized by the Federal Communications Commission for the administration of amateur radio license examinations in the United States. The VEC system is established and outlined in Part 97 of the FCC rules and regulations.

The FCC maintains a list of the authorized VECs and accredited VEs (volunteer examiners).

As of 2026, the FCC recognizes 14 VECs. The American Radio Relay League oversees about two-thirds of all U.S. amateur radio examinations, and a large portion of the rest are overseen by W5YI-VEC. Many individual VECs are ARRL affiliated clubs.

== List ==
Current List of VECs
Organization	Headquarters	Notes	Reference
Anchorage ARC VEC	Anchorage, Alaska	Operated by the Anchorage Amateur Radio Club of the ARRL	
American Radio Relay League (ARRRL)	Newington, Connecticut	Conducts around two thirds of examinations	
Central Alabama VEC	Madison, Alabama	Provides exams throughout the southeast	
Golden Empire Amateur Radio Society (GEARS)	Chico, California	ARRL affiliated club. Offers six annual exams in Chico.	
Greater L.A. Amateur Radio Group	Sacramento, California	Dedicated exam conducting organization active since 1984	
Jefferson Amateur Radio Club	Metairie, Louisiana	ARRL affiliated club offering monthly exams.	
Laurel Amateur Radio Club, Inc.	Tucson, Arizona	ARRL affiliated club	
MRAC VEC, Inc.	New Berlin, Wisconsin	Created by the Milwaukee Radio Amateurs' Club. Active since 1985.	
MO-KAN VEC Coordinator	Shawnee, Kansas	Association of Kansas City area amateur clubs	
San Diego County Amateur Radio Council	San Diego, California	ARRL affiliated club offering weekly exams throughout San Diego County	
Sunnyvale VEC Amateur Radio Club, Inc.	Sunnyvale, California		
W4VEC Volunteer Examiners Club of America	Salisbury, North Carolina	Provides both remote and in person exams.	
W5YI-VEC	Plano, Texas	Second largest VEC after the ARRL. Conducts thousands of exams each year.	
Western Carolina Amateur Radio Society VEC, Inc.	Weaverville, North Carolina	An ARRL designated Special Service Club	

== See also ==
- Amateur radio licensing in the United States
- American Radio Relay League
