= Hurricane Katrina disaster relief =

The disaster recovery response to Hurricane Katrina in 2005 included U.S. federal government agencies such as the Federal Emergency Management Agency (FEMA), the United States Coast Guard (USCG), state and local-level agencies, federal and National Guard soldiers, non-governmental organizations, charities, and private individuals. Tens of thousands of volunteers and troops responded or were deployed to the disaster; most in the affected area but also throughout the U.S. at shelters set up in at least 19 states.

== Overview ==
Monetary donations were way below the records set by the tsunami and 9/11 relief efforts in the U.S. In a reversal of usual positions, the U.S. received international aid and assistance from numerous countries. The National Disaster Medical System had activated essentially all teams in the country, and pre-staged multiple Disaster Medical Assistance Teams (DMATs), Disaster Mortuary Assistance Teams (DMORTs), and Veterinary Medicine Response Teams (VMATs) in Houston and Atlanta the day prior to, and the day of, landfall. When the levees were reported to have broken, the DMATs were moved to Baton Rouge on Tuesday, August 30, and as the needs were identified, teams were moved out that afternoon to the Superdome, and that night to the Louis Armstrong Airport. Three DMATs arrived around 2 am on Wednesday morning, Aug 31, set up a field hospital Base of Operations in Concourse D, began offloading rescuees from helicopters, and provided medical care if necessary. Additional DMATs were deployed there as the volume and tempo of patient arrivals increased, as the hospitals in the city began to evacuate their patients. Over 3,000 patients were cared for, and as DOD Medevac assets began arriving, patients were handed over and moved out to over a dozen cities. This operation peaked during the weekend of September 3 and 4, and was completed by mid-week. Over 20,000 evacuees were also flown out by the civilian air-fleet drafted into service, and 25 deaths occurred there, mostly elderly nursing home and hospice evacuees.

More than 1,000 Army and Air National Guardsmen and 7,200 active-duty troops were stationed in the Gulf Coast region to assist with hurricane relief operations with some remaining several weeks. The military relief effort, known as Joint Task Force Katrina, was commanded by Lieutenant General Russel L. Honoré, commander of the U.S. First Army. At President Bush's urging, the U.S. Senate quickly approved $10.5 billion in aid for victims September 1, 2005. The U.S. House of Representatives voted and approved on the measure Friday, September 2, 2005, without any debate. President Bush requested an additional $51.8 billion on September 7. Congress approved that funding package the next day.

On September 24, 2005, following the havoc caused by Hurricane Rita, the National Guard named Brig. Gen. Douglas Pritt of the 41st Brigade Combat Team, Oregon Army National Guard, head of Joint Task Force Rita (formally called JTF Ponchartrain). The fourteen hundred Oregonian soldiers and airmen, including the 1st Battalion of the 186th Infantry which is designated as a quick response unit, were joined by engineers and military police from Louisiana, a Stryker Brigade from Pennsylvania, and an engineering battalion from Missouri. It is their mission to provide relief support for all of the areas in Texas and Louisiana affected by the two storms and to remove obstructions that might otherwise hinder help to those affected.

Governments of many countries have offered help to the U.S. for disaster relief, including the governments of Canada, France, United Kingdom, Germany and Mexico, with Canada even offering to accept Katrina evacuees. In addition to asking for federal funds, President Bush has enlisted the help of former presidents Bill Clinton and George H. W. Bush to raise additional voluntary contributions, much as they did after the 2004 Indian Ocean earthquake and tsunami.

Many had been critical of the slow response, with many people (particularly in New Orleans) left without water and food for three to five days after the storm. Among the first to express criticism of the management of the crisis had been The Pentagon, who complained only a day after Katrina hit that bureaucratic red tape from the Bush administration and the FEMA (newly reorganized under the Department of Homeland Security) had caused the delay of a scheduled and authorized military hospital ship from Norfolk, Virginia, among other related and prepared active military crisis response procedures.

== Timeline ==
On Friday, August 26, the National Hurricane Center predicted for the first time that Katrina would become a Category 4 storm, and thus exceed the design limits of the New Orleans levees.

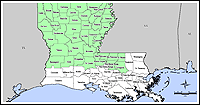
Map of Louisiana parishes eligible for Category B assistance due to September 27 authorization

On Saturday, August 27, President Bush declared a state of emergency under the authority of the Stafford Act for the inland parishes of Louisiana.

The next day, Sunday, August 28, Katrina became a Category 4 hurricane and eventually evolved into a Category 5 storm the very same day, with winds blowing at about 175 mph (280 km/h). New Orleans Mayor Ray Nagin decided not to declare a mandatory evacuation of the city, and instead opened up the Superdome to those who couldn't leave the city. 550 National Guard troops were stationed inside the Superdome to screen evacuees for weapons.

At that point, it was known that the strength of the hurricane would almost certainly exceed the levees' design capacity, and therefore the possibility for major flooding was real. If the levees did fail, people throughout the city would find it very difficult to obtain food, water, and supplies in general. If authorities had wanted to preposition food, the Superdome would have been a logical place, as the population knew it was a designated central location. The Louisiana National Guard delivered enough food for 15,000 people for 3 days.

On that same day, President Bush designated six counties of Alabama and eleven in Mississippi as eligible for assistance.

On Monday, August 29, at 6:00 am local time, Katrina made landfall. The Louisiana National Guard had called almost 3,500 of its members to state active duty as of 7 a.m. Army Lieutenant Colonel Pete Schneider reported a successful evacuation from the city, crediting the Louisiana Guard's partners in neighboring states for carrying out "a coordinated effort" that incorporated lessons learned from past evacuations. Schneider said during an interview today with Fox News the state stood ready to house evacuees at the Superdome "for as long as it takes", reporting that although the massive structure's protective lining tore in the hurricane's Category 4 winds, the roof itself appears to be intact.

Louisiana has 65 percent of its troops available for state missions; Mississippi, 60 percent; Alabama, 77 percent; and Florida, 74 percent.

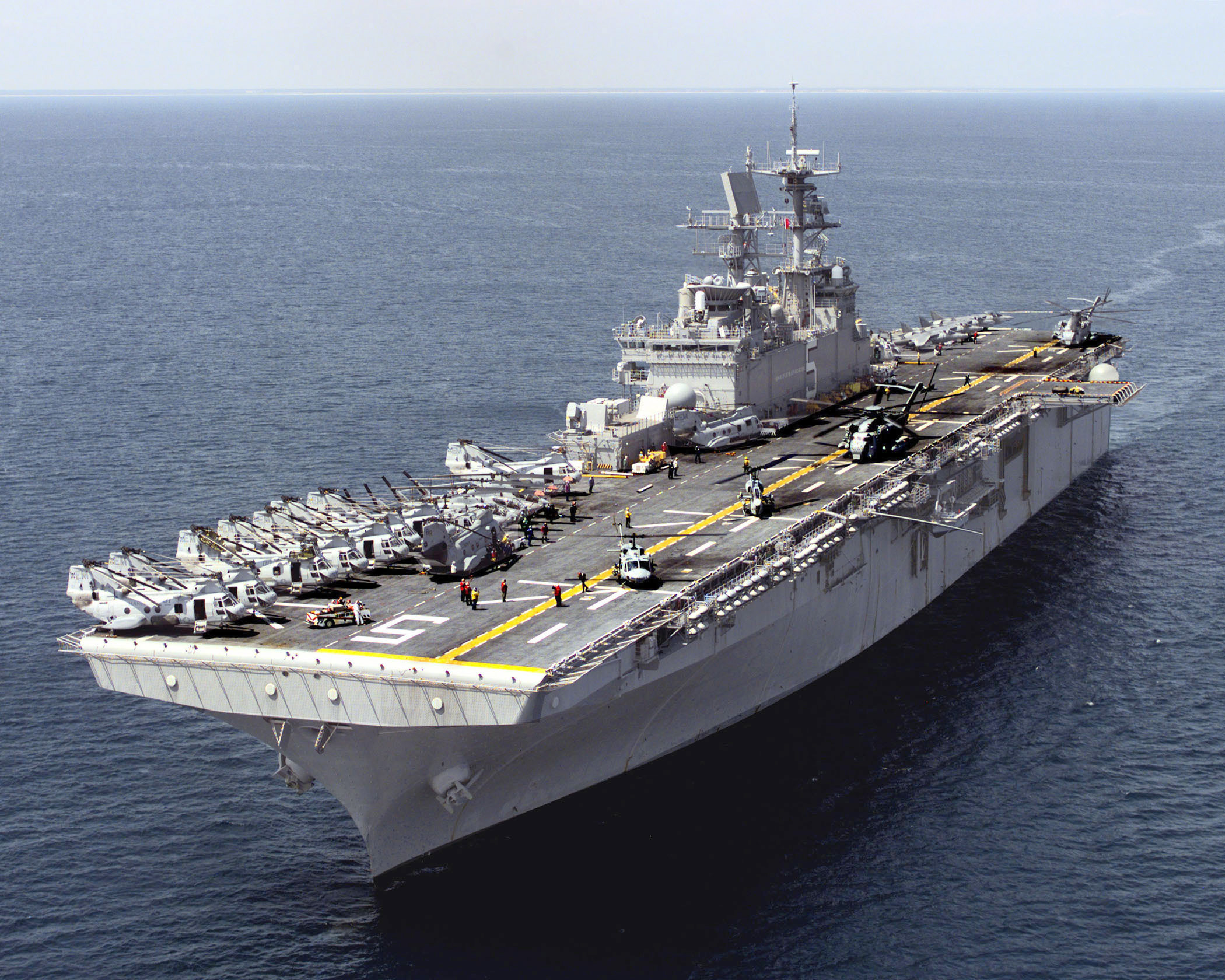
USS Bataan performed Louisiana relief operations.

USS Bataan was positioned near New Orleans prior to Katrina making landfall, and began relief operations on August 30.

The next day, Tuesday, August 30, An estimated 7,500 National Guard troops from Alabama, Florida, Louisiana and Mississippi were on duty, supporting civil authorities, distributing generators, providing medical care, and setting up shelters for displaced residents. As of 8 a.m., almost 3,800 Louisiana Army and Air Guard members were on duty to remove debris, provide security and shelter, distribute water, food and ice, and offer medical and law-enforcement support. The Louisiana Guard was coordinating with Florida, Georgia and Texas to secure two UH-60 Black Hawk and five CH-47 Chinook helicopters to support their operations. In Mississippi, more than 1,900 Guard troops were providing similar support, basing their operations at Camp Shelby. In Florida, more than 700 Florida Guard members were on active duty.

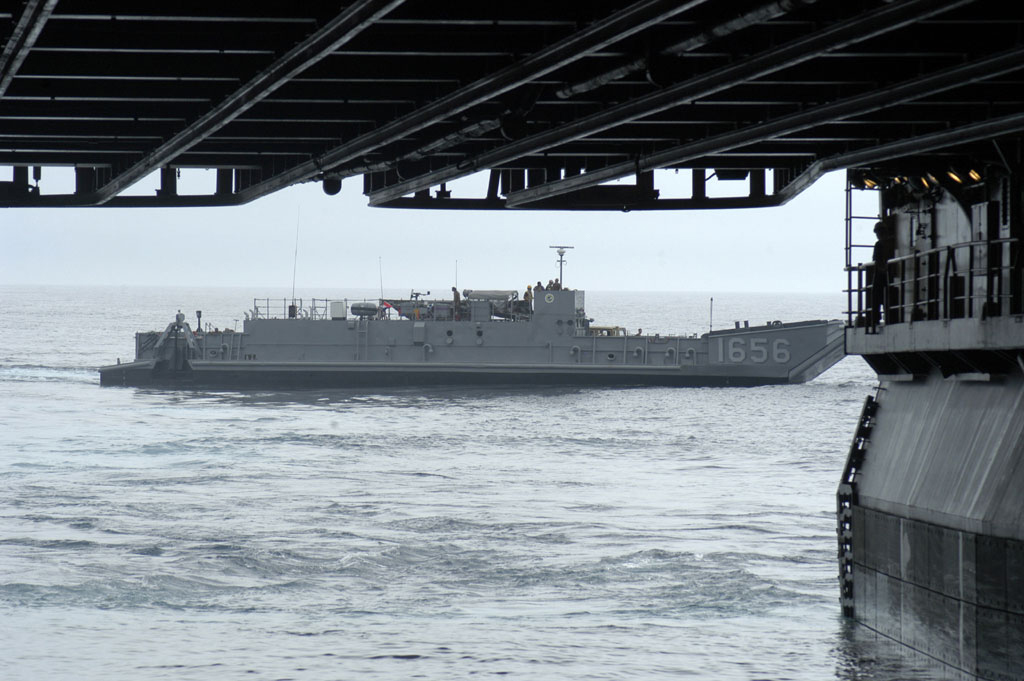
Landing craft heads to Louisiana from USS Bataan

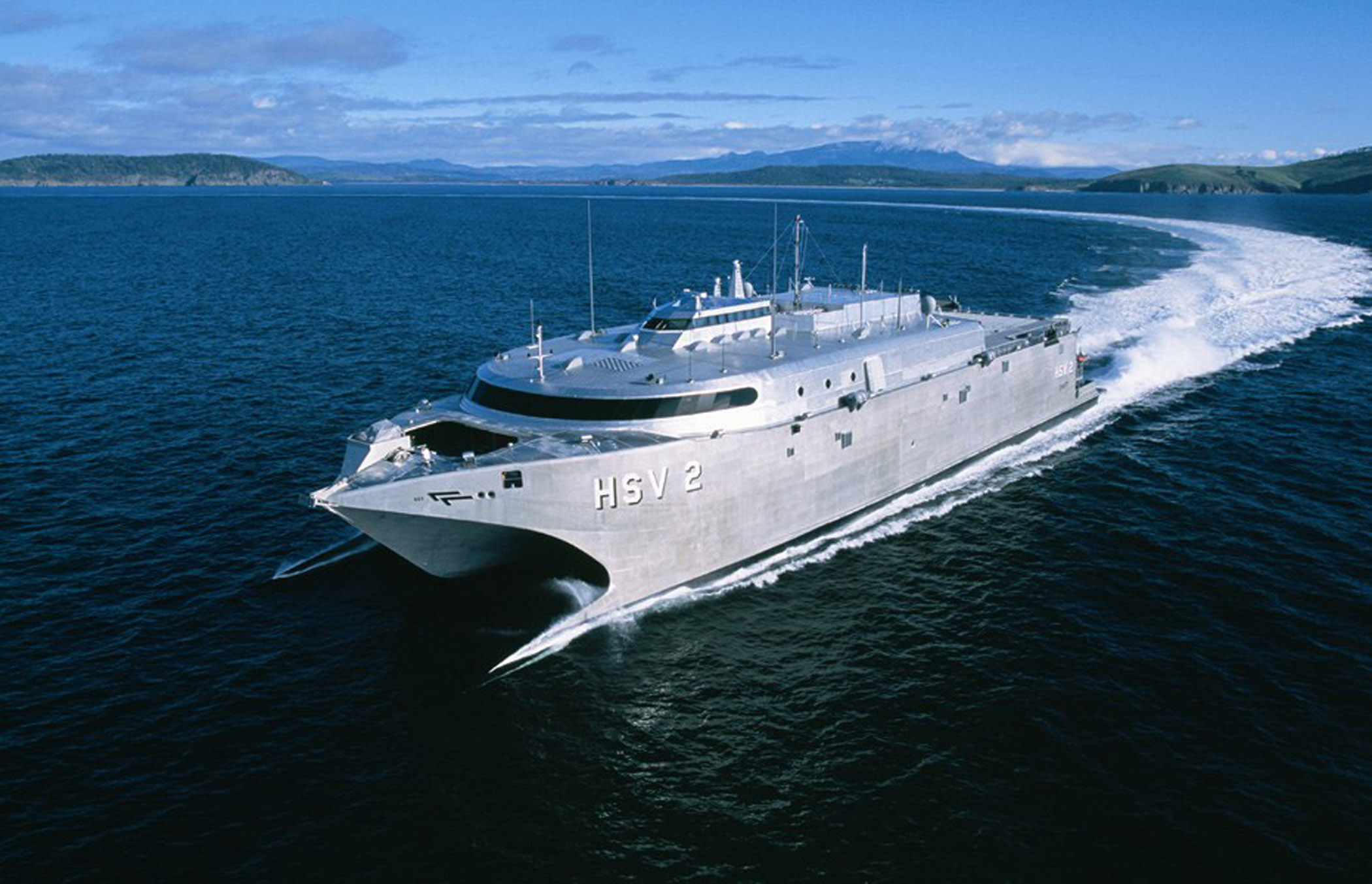
HSV-2 Swift operated with USS Bataan.

On August 31, the number of military units were on duty in Louisiana, Mississippi, Alabama and Florida rose to almost 8,300. Joint Task Force Katrina set up at Camp Shelby, Mississippi, as the Defense Department's focal point to support FEMA's relief efforts.

- The JTF Katrina Joint Force Maritime Component Command (JFMCC), under command of Rear Admiral Joseph Kilkenny, initially established at Naval Air Station Pensacola to oversee rescue operations and delivery of relief supplies to the Gulf Coast, and restoration of naval. shore facilities in the Gulf Coast. The JTF Katrina JFMCC was later shifted to New Orleans upon arrival of USS Iwo Jima and the Deployable Joint Command and Control DJC2 operations center. Iwo Jima also served as the Presidential Support Platform, JTF Katrina Forward, and Joint Rescue Coordination Center. Rear Admiral Kilkenny and staff later served as JTF Rita JFMCC providing support to Hurricane Rita disaster recovery.
- Four MH-53 Sea Stallion and two HH-60 Seahawk helicopters from USS Bataan, which is based out of Naval Station Ingleside, were flying medical-evacuation and search-and-rescue missions in Louisiana, and Bataan's hospital was preparing for possible use for medical support.
- High-Speed Vessel HSV-2 Swift, stationed in Little Creek, Virginia, sailed to the waters off Louisiana to provide support.
- The Iwo Jima Amphibious Readiness Group sailed from Norfolk, Va., loaded with disaster response equipment and reached the Louisiana coast in 5 days. The group consists of USS Iwo Jima, USS Shreveport, USS Tortuga and USNS Arctic.
- The hospital ship USNS Comfort left Baltimore to bring medical assistance to the Gulf region and reached the area in a week.

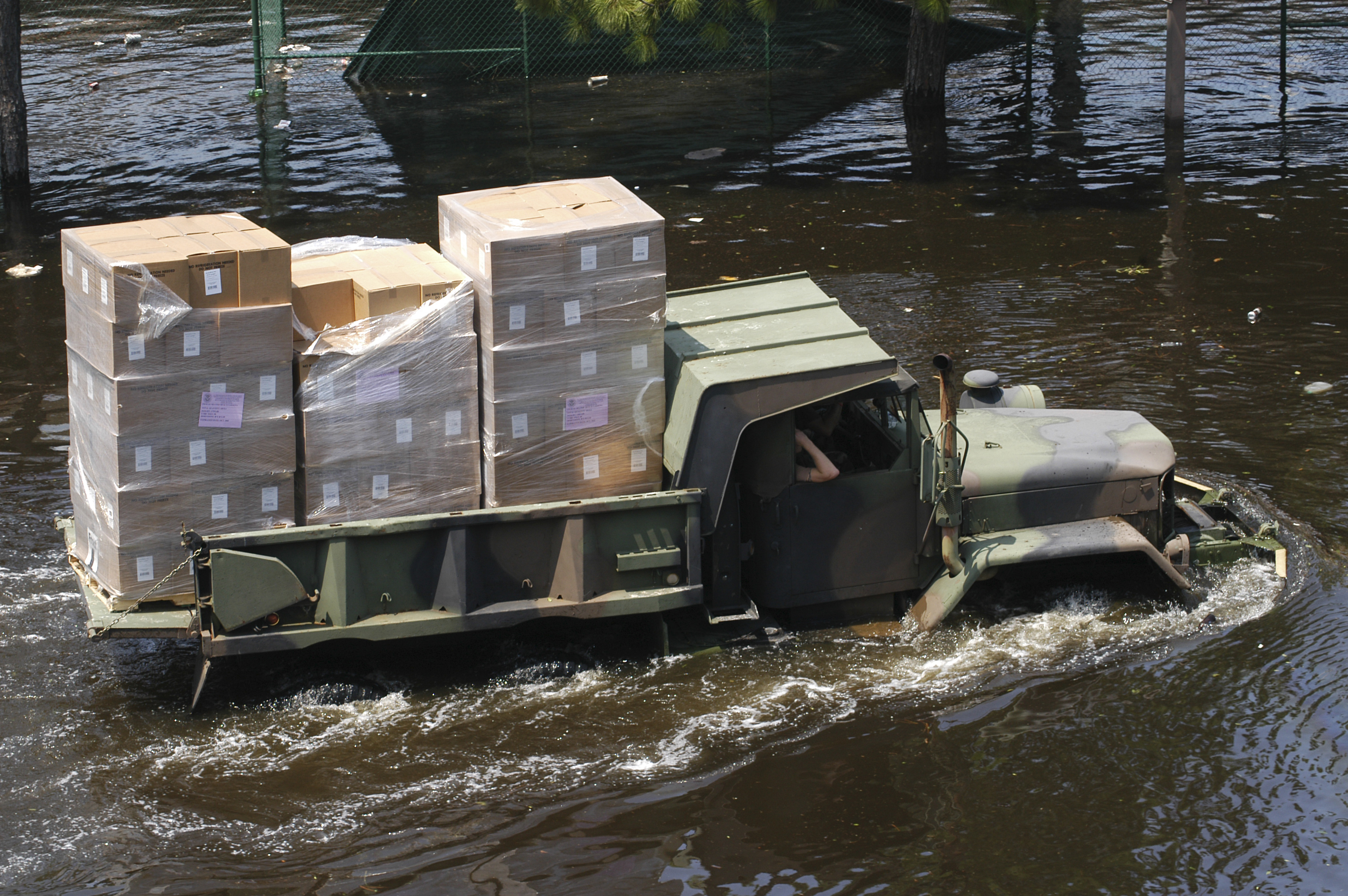
Supplies being delivered to the Superdome on August 31 through high waters.

The guardsmen remain under their respective governors' control, which enables them to provide law-enforcement support in the affected regions—something the Posse Comitatus Act prohibits active-duty forces from doing within the United States.

By Thursday, September 1, The National Guardsmen accompanied by buses (475 in all) and supply trucks arrived at the Superdome. However, media reports stated "few buses" were actually there.

FEMA director Brown said that he had only earlier that day learned that the New Orleans Convention Center had contained thousands of people without food or water for 3–4 days. He said trucks were on the way. Brown did not give ordinary people the permission to drive the buses delivered by the National Guard - which led to the issue of there being no certified bus drivers. At this point major news sources had been reporting on the situation for a few days.

By Friday, September 2, seven days after firm predictions of a Category 5 hurricane, a convoy of several dozen trucks and buses rolled into New Orleans carrying food, water, and other supplies. Some of these trucks were Palletized Load System (PLS) manufactured by the Oshkosh Truck Corporation. These transports can carry more than 15 tons of cargo and can travel in 4 feet (1.2 m) of water.

For comparison, when the Indian Ocean earthquake of 2004 tsunami struck the politically fractured city of Banda Aceh without warning, Indonesian officials not only knew about the situation on the ground, but delivered 175 tons of food only 2 days after the disaster. This was due to the fact that the transports were of a worldwide effort, whereas the Katrina relief effort was handled by the U.S. government, alone.

== Military ==
=== Joint Task Force Katrina ===
Lt. Gen. Russel L. Honoré of the Army was appointed to run a temporary special command, known as Joint Task Force (JTF) Katrina, to coordinate all military responses to the effort, which was based at Camp Shelby in Mississippi. FEMA asked the Pentagon to have the U.S. Northern Command stand ready for assistance.

=== National Guard deployment ===
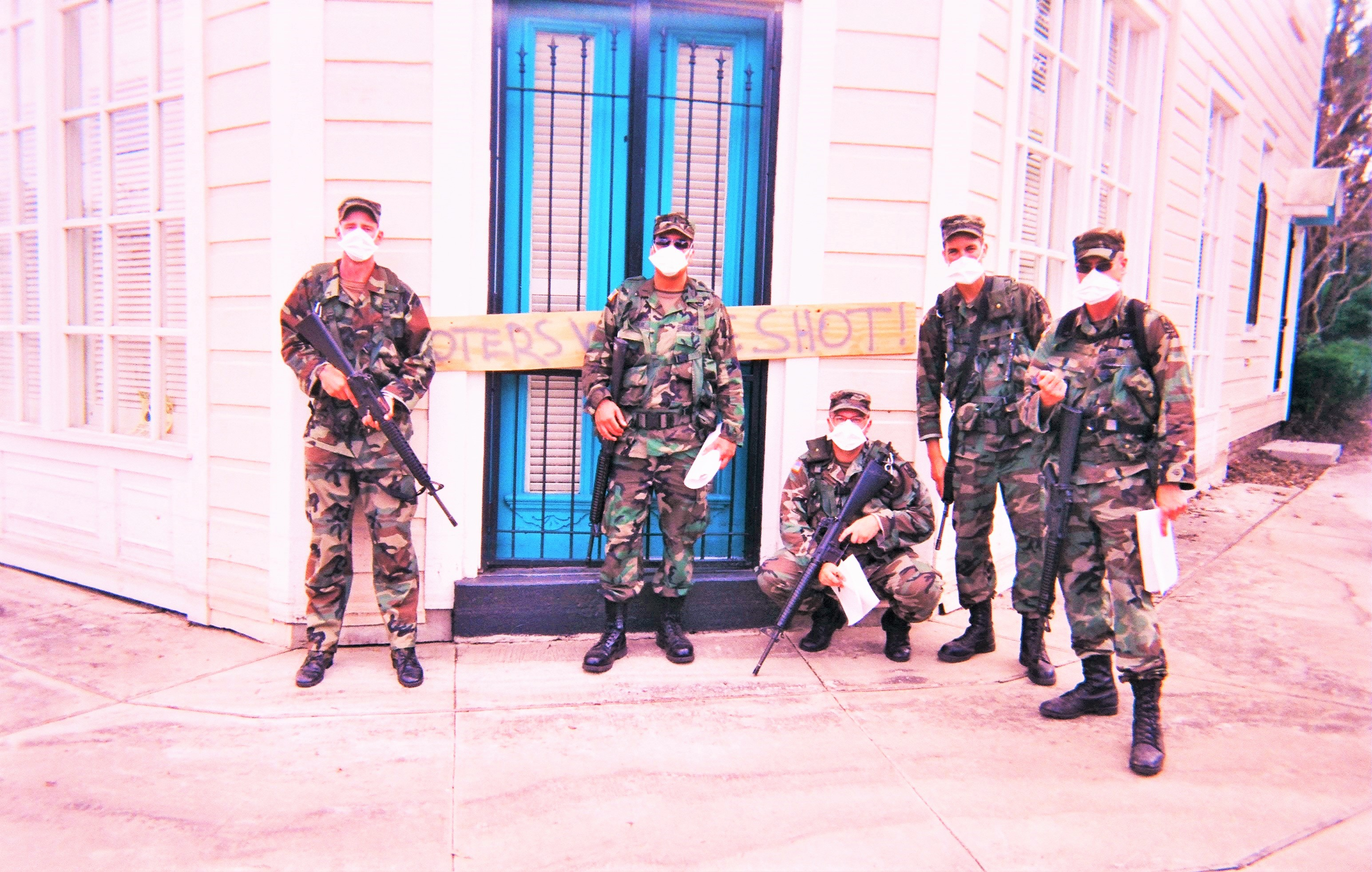
U.S. Army Infantry patrolling New Orleans in an area previously underwater, September 2005.

Since the hurricane passed through, the governors of Alabama, Mississippi, Florida, Kansas, Pennsylvania, and Louisiana; as well as California and Texas, collectively called to duty more than 50,000 Guard troops.

=== Army ===
After the New Orleans levees failed, multiple U.S. Army assets were deployed to assist relief efforts; the 67th Expeditionary Signal Battalion was deployed out of Fort Gordon to set up communications for JTF Katrina's forward command post, the 319th Airborne Field Artillery of the 82nd Airborne Division was tasked with assisting evacuation efforts at Louis Armstrong New Orleans International Airport, taking responsibility for passenger manifests and security screening. 3rd Brigade, 82nd Airborne Division assisted FEMA in search and rescue operations across the city, The 56th Signal Battalion linked commercial communications to military communications, the 14th Combat Support Hospital established presence in downtown New Orleans to aid survivors, the 21st Chemical Company decontaminated 400 personnel, 783 vehicles, and 73 boats, and also helped in decontaminating both Touro Infirmary and Charity Hospital. 13th Corps Support Command, 82nd Airborne Division helped take over logistics after FEMA asked for the DoD to take responsibility for the relief operation's logistics. After the water had subsided, paratroopers from the 82nd Airborne Division helped evacuate the New Orleans Super Dome and Convention Center and also patrolled the streets of New Orleans in the aftermath of the disaster to maintain order in the city.

The United States Army Corps of Engineers played a considerable role in the response to the disaster as well, engaging in a three-prong mission, the first being to drain New Orleans, the second being to repair the breaches in the levee involving the enlistment of several military and civilian contractor assets, and the third being to restore the water pumps that defended the city from flooding. USACE also helped deliver food to victims of the disaster. By By September 2, USACE had delivered 1.9 million MREs, 6.7 million liters of water and 1.7 million pounds of ice. By September 15, drainage operations were 60% complete. By the end of the September, USACE and the relevant assets at its disposal had removed 4.3 million cubic yards of debris in Louisiana and Mississippi, carted off 120 million tons of trash, and disposed of 36 million pounds of rotting meat. By October 11, drainage operations had been completed.

=== Navy ===
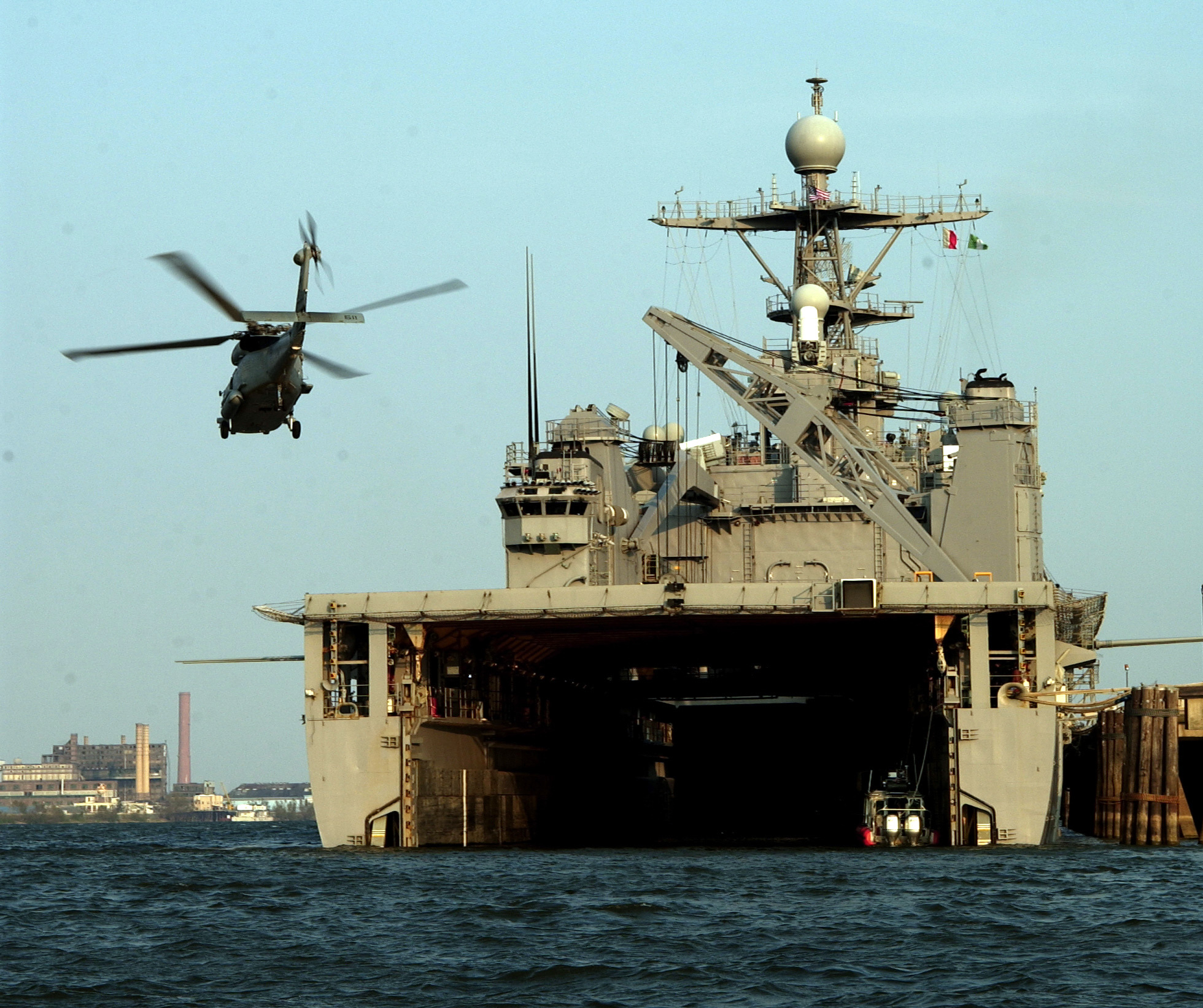
USS Tortuga at dock in New Orleans.

The United States Navy also began Hurricane Katrina relief efforts. Several ships were dispatched to the area:

- Aircraft carriers
  - USS Harry S. Truman (arrived September 4)
- Amphibious assault ships
  - USS Bataan (arrived August 30)
  - USS Iwo Jima (arrived September 3)
- Amphibious transport docks
  - USS Shreveport (arrived September 3)
- Dock landing ships
  - USS Tortuga (arrived September 3)
  - USS Whidbey Island (arrived September 3)
- Fast combat support ships
  - USNS Arctic (arrived August 31)
- Hospital ships
  - USNS Comfort (arrived September 8)
- Rescue and salvage
  - USS Grapple (shipped out August 31, arrived September 4)

The amphibious assault ships carried CH-53 Sea Stallion and SH-60 Sea Hawk helicopters which were already being used in search and rescue operations. Harry S. Truman was used as the command center for Naval operations in the area. The Navy also arranged to send eight civilian 14-person swift boat rescue teams to the disaster zone using C-5 Galaxy cargo planes.

=== Marine Corps ===
The United States Marine Corps sent active and reserve marines to assist in the search and rescue from 4th AABN (Assault Amphibian Battalion), Bessemer, Alabama. They lived in Slidell, Louisiana and Picayune, Mississippi during their efforts.

=== Air Force ===
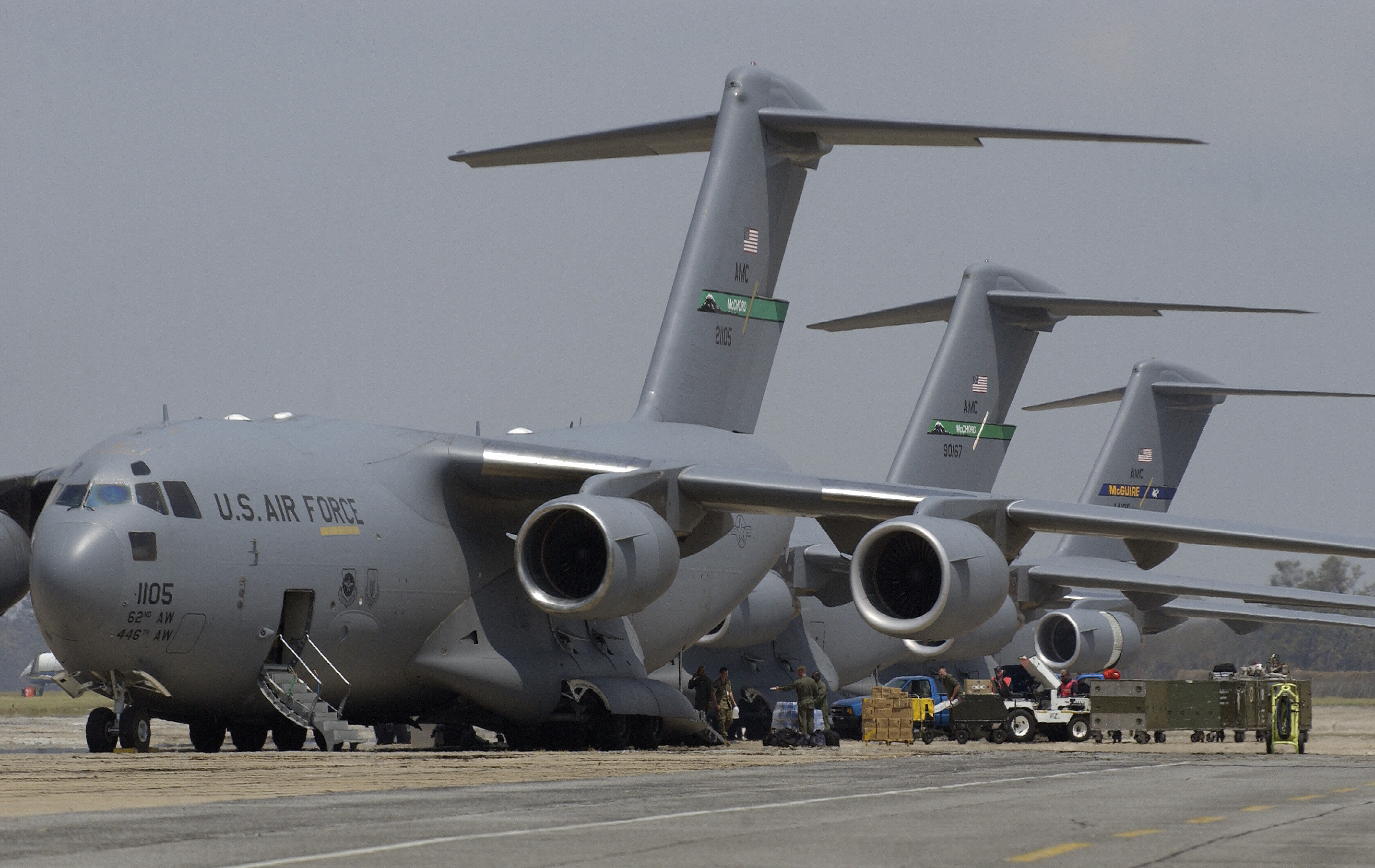
U.S. Air Force cargo aircraft unload several tons of supplies at Keesler Air Force Base in Biloxi, Mississippi.

The United States Air Force responded by sending search and rescue, aeromedical evacuation, relief supplies as well as medical care to the affected areas. Keesler Air Force Base was evacuated prior to impact, however out of the students training on the site around 400 volunteered to stay back and clean up the base. Thanks to their efforts the base was operational 6 months earlier than expected. The Air Force has rescued over 4,000 people to date. The Air Force has also evacuated more than 25,000 people in need of medical care from Louis Armstrong New Orleans International Airport. Nine million packaged meals were airlifted into the region. The Air National Guard was also a major presence at The Superdome (which evacuated more than 25,000 survivors from the area).

=== Coast Guard ===
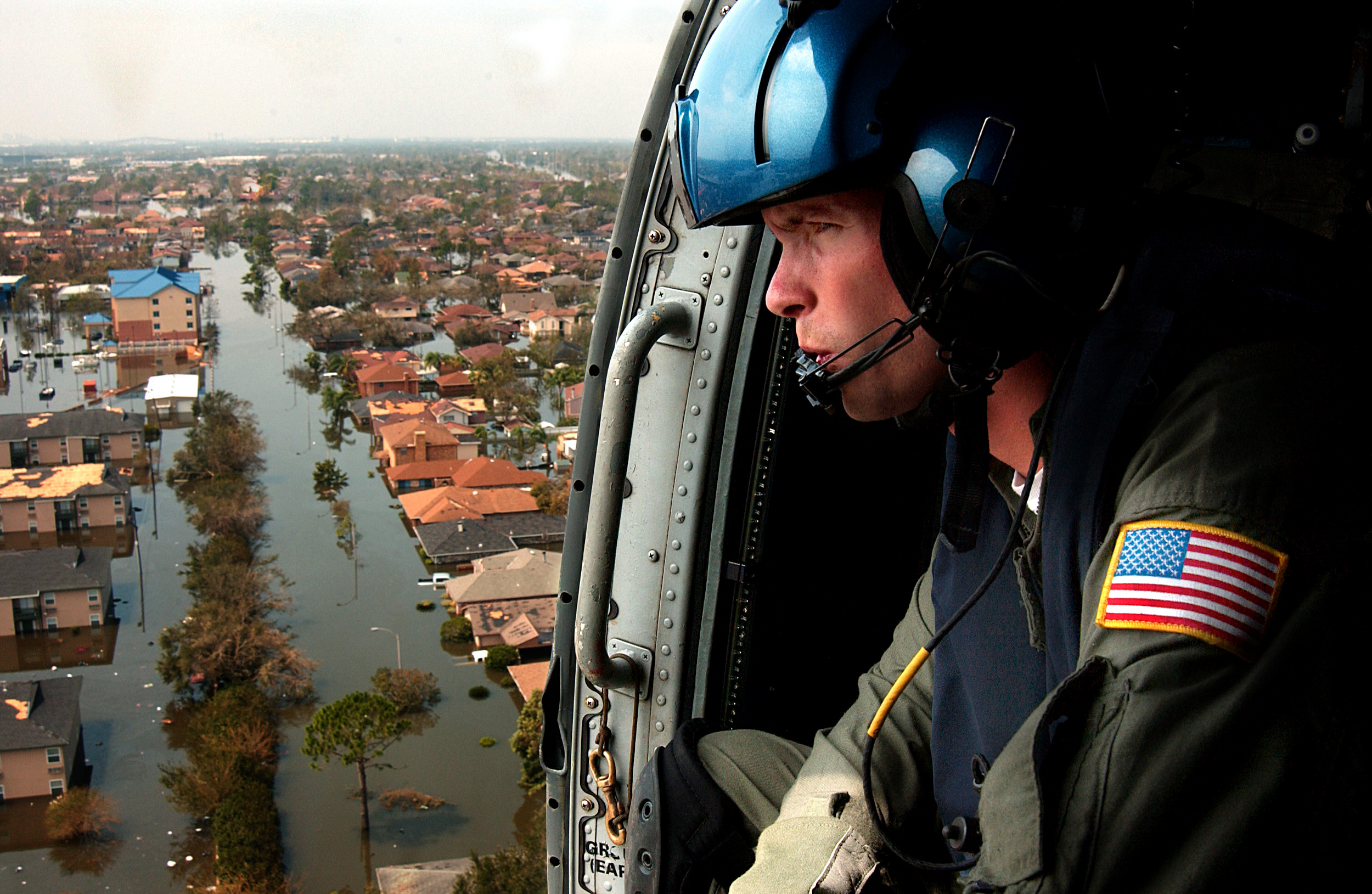
A U.S. Coast Guard aircrewman searches for survivors in New Orleans in the aftermath of Katrina.

The Coast Guard responded by moving as many helicopters as it could to the affected areas, calling in aircraft from as far away as Cape Cod, Massachusetts. 500 Coast Guard reservists were called to active duty, and many of the hundreds of small boats in the fleet were sent to help. Coast Guard helicopters flew around-the-clock rescue missions. The Coast Guard was one of the first federal agencies to begin rescue operations, despite the fact that almost half the local Coast Guard personnel lost their own homes in the hurricane. They rescued or evacuated more than 33,500 people, six times as many as they saved in all of 2004. According to an article in Time, in the famously decimated St. Bernard Parish, east of New Orleans, Sheriff Jack Stephens says the Coast Guard was the only federal agency to provide any significant assistance for a full week after the storm. Coast Guard personnel and assets from all over the country were deployed in the area including 29 Coast Guard cutters and 52 aircraft. The Coast Guard recalled 500 reservists to active duty and had the authorization to recall up to 800 reservists.

=== Foreign military contributions ===
The Canadian Navy deployed a task force comprising three warships—HMCS Athabaskan, HMCS Toronto and HMCS Ville de Québec—along with the Coast Guard vessel CCGS Sir William Alexander and three Sea King helicopters and one BO-105 helicopter to the area.

The Royal Netherlands Navy frigate HNLMS Van Amstel arrived September 7.

The Mexican Navy sent the warship Papaloapan. It arrived on September 8 to the Mississippi shores with 250 metric tons of food, medicines and supplies. It carried two MI-17 helicopters, an ambulance, seven amphibious vehicles and eight 6-track all-terrain vehicles.

On 1 September, the Republic of Singapore Air Force (RSAF) sent three CH-47 Chinook helicopters to Louisiana to assist in relief operations. The three aircraft were based at the Peace Prairie Singapore training detachment of the Texas Army National Guard's 149th Aviation Regiment in Grand Prairie AASF, Grand Prairie, Texas. They arrived in Fort Polk, Louisiana in the afternoon of 1 September to aid rescue operations mainly in resupply and airlifting missions.

Thirty eight RSAF personnel, comprising pilots, aircrew and technicians were also deployed. The Singapore team worked with the Texas Army National Guard in the relief efforts.

On 5 September, a fourth Chinook helicopter was sent to help in the relief operations, and the number of personnel deployed increased to 45.

Throughout the Singaporean relief effort, the four Chinooks flew 61 sorties. They transported hundreds of evacuees from flooded areas to safety, especially from the Louisiana Superdome and Ernest N. Morial Convention Center. They also picked up stragglers around the New Orleans area. The Chinooks carried a total of 540 tonnes of equipment, humanitarian aid, cargo, and supplies and rescued over 800 evacuees. They were involved in moving sand bags to block up the broken levees. The number of aircraft sent exceeded that of all other foreign countries.[1]

== Government non-military ==
=== Federal ===
Some disaster recovery response to Katrina began before the storm, with Federal Emergency Management Agency preparations that ranged from logistical supply deployments to a mortuary team with refrigerated trucks. However, the federal government's overall lack of response has been widely criticized since the events occurred.

President George W. Bush asked Secretary Michael Chertoff of the Department of Homeland Security to coordinate the Federal response. Chertoff designated Michael Brown, head of the FEMA as the Principal Federal Official to lead the deployment and coordination of all federal response resources and forces in the Gulf Coast region.

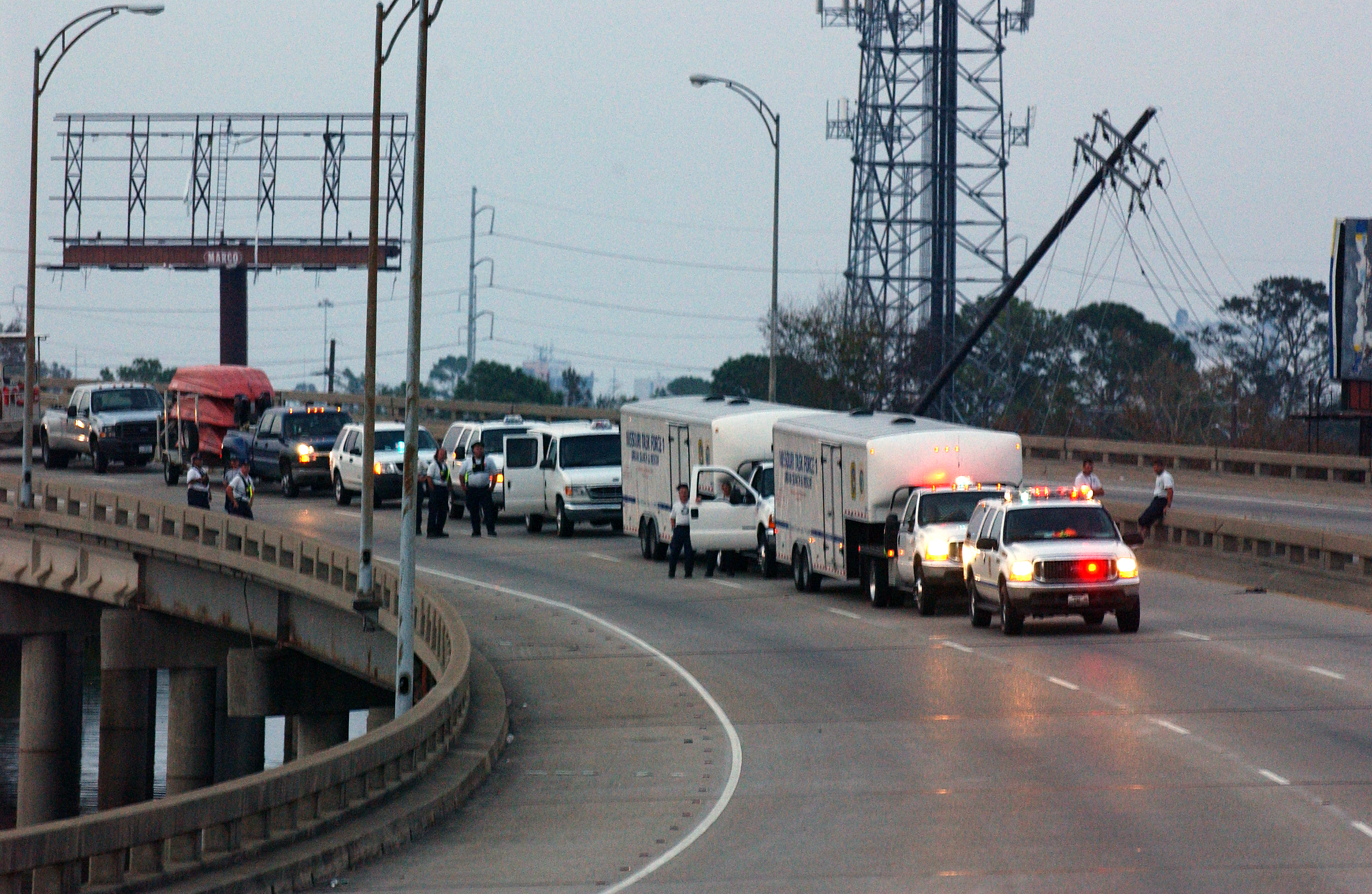
A FEMA Urban Search and Rescue Task Force in Louisiana after Hurricane Katrina.

FEMA deployed all 28 of its Urban Search & Rescue Task Forces with 11 going to Mississippi and 7 to Louisiana. The remaining 10 US&R Task Forces were deployed to Texas staging areas. FEMA also deployed 29 Disaster Medical Assistance Teams (DMAT); 5 Disaster Mortuary Operational Response Teams (DMORT); 2 Veterinary Medical Assistance Teams (VMAT); and 1 Mental Health Team to Louisiana and 10 DMATs, 5 DMORTS, 2 VMATS, and 1 Mental Health Team to Mississippi.

FEMA also partnered with the Department of Transportation to send 1700 trucks of water, ice, and ready-to-eat meals. The Department of Transportation sent 390 trucks carrying water, tarpaulins, mobile homes and forklifts. The United States Public Health Service was activated and sent dozens of officers to supervise medical response. Though the hurricane closed several airports for some time to come, the Federal Aviation Administration rushed to reopen one runway at Louis Armstrong New Orleans International Airport so that relief flights could begin.

A summary of other Federal responses

- Department of Homeland Security
  - The Jones Act was temporarily waived allowing foreign flagged vessels to transport cargo from one U.S. Port to another U.S. Port.
- The Department of Education coordinated the enrollment of displaced students in school districts across the country.
- The Department of Housing and Urban Development announced a special 90-day moratorium on all foreclosures of FHA-insured properties in the Presidentially declared disaster areas.
- The Environmental Protection Agency temporarily allowed the supply of gasoline and diesel fuels that do not meet standards for emissions through September 15, 2005. The EPA also collected and analyzed flood water samples for biological and chemical contaminants.
- The Department of Energy loaned oil from the Strategic Petroleum Reserve under short-term contractual agreements, to be returned to the reserve once supply conditions return to normal.
- The Department of Labor announced a National Emergency Grant to establish approximately 10,000 temporary jobs for eligible dislocated workers to help in the recovery and clean-up efforts underway in Mississippi.
- The United States Peace Corps sent some 272 returned Peace Corps volunteers to the Katrina zone to serve as Crisis Corps volunteers and assist FEMA in relief and reconstruction efforts. It was the first and only time Peace Corps volunteers have been deployed within the U.S.
- Congress passed the Katrina Emergency Tax Relief Act (KETRA) of 2005 (H.R. 3768) which temporarily extended all deadlines related to tax returns, payments or other time-sensitive activities for those in the affected area until February 2006.

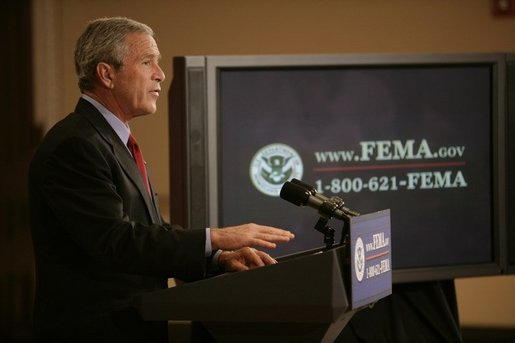
President George W. Bush discussing the Hurricane Katrina relief on September 8, 2005.

On Friday, September 2, 2005, Reuters published an article stating that five Silver Fox UAVs (the same UAVs being used in Iraq and Afghanistan for intelligence gathering) equipped with thermal imaging technology were going to be used in the search and rescue missions in New Orleans. Pennsylvanian Republican Representative Curt Weldon stated that he was able to bypass government bureaucracy and obtain the UAVs from an unnamed private company. Weldon stated that the UAVs were being shipped to Baton Rouge and requested deployment of U.S. military personnel who are capable of operating the UAVs and that they could be in operation within hours of arrival.

The Department of Homeland Security issued these key statistics as of 10 a.m. on September 3, 2005:

- Lives saved — 11,500
- Citizens evacuated — 25,000
- Water distributed by FEMA — 6.7 million liters
- MREs distributed by FEMA — 1.9 million
- U.S. Coast Guard responders — 4,000
- National Guard responders — 22,000
- FEMA responders — 5,000

Several Carnival Cruise Line ships were chartered by the American government to provide housing for those who required it. The Salt Lake Tribune reported on September 4, 2005, that the authorities had requested that aid workers not disclose the final destination of those making the transit because a few had caused a ruckus upon finding that they were heading to a location that they held in disfavor.

=== State and local ===
Governor Kathleen Blanco's New Orleans Hurricane Relief Foundation was created on August 30, 2005. Local governments across the U.S. sent aid in the form of ambulances, search teams and disaster supplies. Shelters to house those displaced were established as far away as Utah. The Arkansas Department of Parks and Tourism contacted travelers having reservations at state parks to see if the travelers would voluntarily give up their reservations to persons fleeing Katrina, primarily in the southern part of the state where refugees had already taken shelter (at Lake Chicot State Park, just across the Louisiana state line, a 26-member family from New Orleans, including a grandmother on oxygen, occupied seven of the park's cabins). In any event, refugees at state parks would not be evicted for prior reservations, and those with reservations but no room would either get space at another state park or a gift certificate.

Arkansas Visitors Information Centers in Texarkana, El Dorado, Helena, and Lake Village directed refugees to shelters and hotels/motels with available space.

Governor Mike Huckabee issued a proclamation releasing $75,000 of state funds to assist shelters in 14 southern and delta counties in Arkansas. At least 850 guardsmen of the Arkansas National Guard were activated and sent to Louisiana and Mississippi. Governor Huckabee also announced that the state Departments of Health and Human Services and Emergency Management as well as the Arkansas Pharmacists Association would provide free emergency prescriptions and access to dialysis machines.

Schools and colleges across the country enrolled students displaced by the storm despite uncertainty over where funding would come from. U.S. Education Secretary Margaret Spellings said on September 12 that 372,000 elementary and high school students had been displaced. Over 715 schools were closed with at least 36 heavy damaged or completely destroyed. About 100,000 college students were also displaced and at least 15 colleges were still closed at that time. Primary and secondary schools are required to educate any "homeless" students in their district and 25 states reported having taken in Katrina victims. FEMA declared that opening temporary schools and hiring mental health counselors would be reimbursable but the hiring of extra teachers and buying of books would not be.

1000 firefighters volunteered to be sent to the affected region, with their home towns picking up the tab to provide cover in their absence. FEMA had them handing out leaflets, while on September 5 the first assignment for a 50-strong team from Atlanta was "to stand beside President Bush as he tours devastated areas."

=== AmeriCorps ===
AmeriCorps sent several crews to Texas, Mississippi and Louisiana in response to Hurricane Katrina and Hurricane Rita. The crews originated from two main organizations, the National Civilian Community Corps (NCCC) and the Washington Conservation Corps (WCC), as well as from smaller Americorps organizations such as Americorps St. Louis' Emergency Response Team (ERT). The crews performed a number of relief tasks for hurricane survivors, including support on the FEMA/Carnival Cruise Line shelter ship, tarping damaged roofs, and debris removal. As of the beginning of 2006, AmeriCorps teams have been involved in the rebuilding efforts in Louisiana and Mississippi. As of May 2006, AmeriCorps reported that it would continue to send relief to affected areas.

== Non-governmental organizations ==
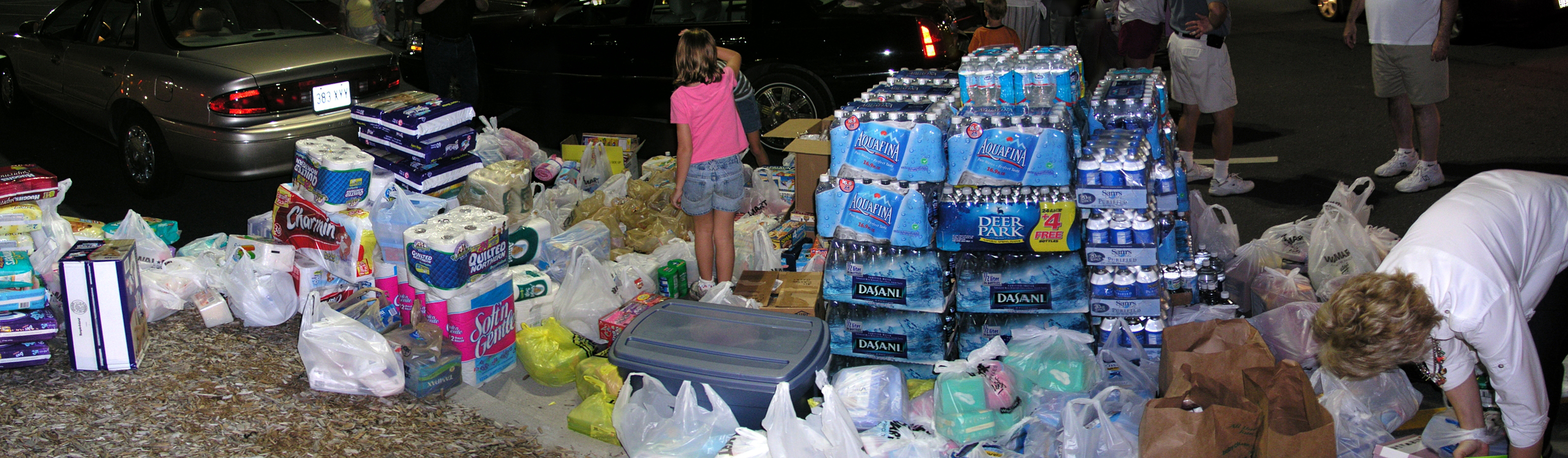
Many local charities are pitching in to help send supplies to victims of hurricane Katrina.

=== American Red Cross ===
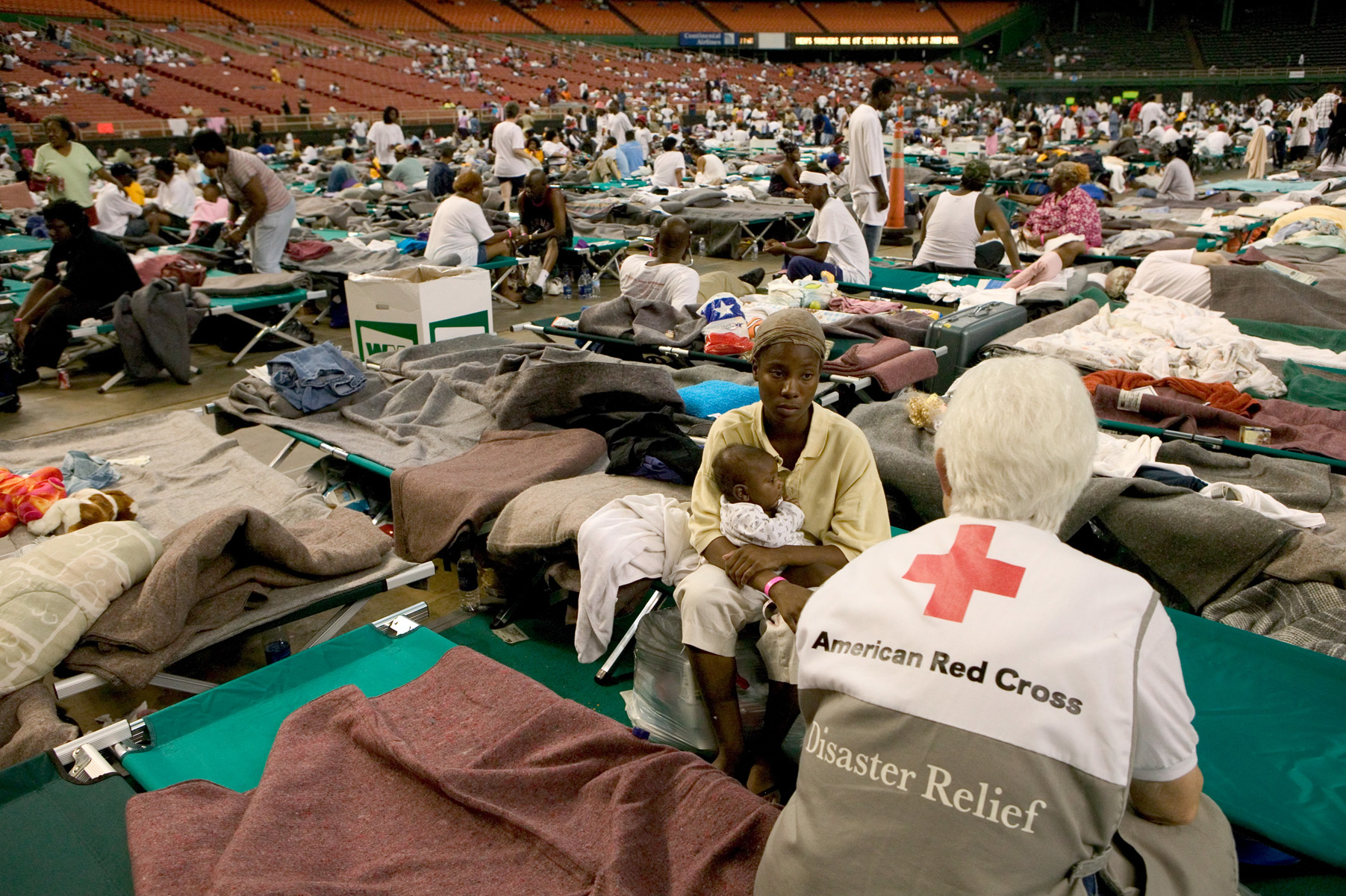
American Red Cross personnel attending refugees in the Reliant Astrodome.

The American Red Cross mobilized the largest relief effort in its 124-year history to aid the victims of Hurricane Katrina. Local Chapters across the nation mobilised tens of thousands of volunteers for immediate deployment to the disaster region.

In the first two weeks after the storm, the Red Cross had brought 74,000 volunteers who provided shelter to 160,000 evacuees and more than 7.5 million hot meals. More than 250 Emergency Response Vehicles (ERVs) were sent to provide food and water to victims. By September 11, 75,000 evacuees remained in 445 shelters in 19 states. By that date, the Red Cross was calling for 40,000 new volunteers to relieve those who initially responded. Disaster response classes were training tens of thousands across the country.

The American Red Cross Disaster Relief Fund collected donations from the public for the relief effort. By September 28, they had raised about one billion dollars in cash and pledges, surpassing the rate of donation for the September 11 attacks. This is ten times more money than the next largest amount collected by a charity, the Salvation Army. The Red Cross estimated that its response would cost some $2 billion of which $100 million was expected to be reimbursed by FEMA, while the rest would need to come from donations. Yahoo!, Google and later Amazon.com set up donation pages for the Red Cross.

As the Red Cross had raised the vast majority of donations and its response is limited to disaster aid and not to recovery, some charities suggested that the Red Cross share money with groups engaged in rebuilding efforts.

The American Red Cross has not been allowed by Louisiana to provide aid within the city of New Orleans.

=== Amateur radio operators ===
The president of the American Radio Relay League, Jim Haynie, sent a message to all amateur radio operators noting that the situation in New Orleans and other affected areas is "simply too dangerous and no one is being allowed in". Many media outlets say communications infrastructure is overloaded and destroyed in many places in the disaster area. During the storm, amateur operators gave weather reports to the National Hurricane Center in Florida using HF radio. Operators are also handling health and welfare messages for organizations such as the Salvation Army and Red Cross. Many amateur radio organizations are staging outside the affected area getting ready to deploy into the city and suburbs.

On September 1, the American Red Cross asked the ARRL to help provide radio and amateur support for its 35 kitchens and 250 shelters. By September 3, the ARRL had set up amateur radio operations at the American Red Cross Disaster Relief Headquarters in Montgomery Alabama.

=== America's Second Harvest ===
America's Second Harvest (now known as Feeding America) responded to the efforts by collecting over 33 million pounds of food specifically for Katrina relief. Since the food bank in New Orleans was non-operational for a short period of time after the hurricane hit, a temporary warehouse was set up in Baker, Louisiana. This operation distributed food to people who were in need before the hurricane as well as people now displaced by Katrina's wreckage.

Second Harvesters Food Bank of Greater New Orleans which is a part of America's Second Harvest was operation within a few days and coordinating efforts with the staff in Baker, LA.

=== Camp Hope ===
Camp Hope is a volunteer camp located in Violet, LA, which has housed volunteers in the Hurricane Katrina recovery effort of St. Bernard Parish since June 1, 2006. The economic recovery of the Parish is dependent on the removal of debris to facilitate the return of both residents and businesses.

The mission of Camp Hope is to house and facilitate volunteer relief efforts in St Bernard Parish and around the New Orlean's area. Those efforts include managing and participating in the removal of health and safety hazards from properties throughout St Bernard parish with the assistance of the local, state, federal, volunteer and non-governmental agencies.

As of August 16, 2006, volunteers in St. Bernard had completed 1,668 homes in the Parish.

=== Family information websites ===
Several websites were set up to help family members find out information about each other in the chaos. Some include the Red Cross, The Weather Channel, local newspapers, Craigslist, and others. Yahoo set up 100 Internet-linked computers at the Astrodome and developed a meta-search of evacuee registration websites. On September 11, despite having reunited several families, the National Center for Missing and Exploited Children had a list of 1,600 children listed as missing by their parents, or who were seeking their families.

Problems were that many survivors had no internet access, let alone electrical power, let alone computers or even computer literacy. There were also many sites so a searcher would have to go through several and sort through the many different search protocols and syntax. Another problem in theory is fraud, and another problem is that many sites only included last and first names which in a mass of several hundred thousand displaced persons obviously included many duplicates.

=== Other organizations ===
Many charities immediately began fund-raising efforts on behalf of Katrina victims and survivors.

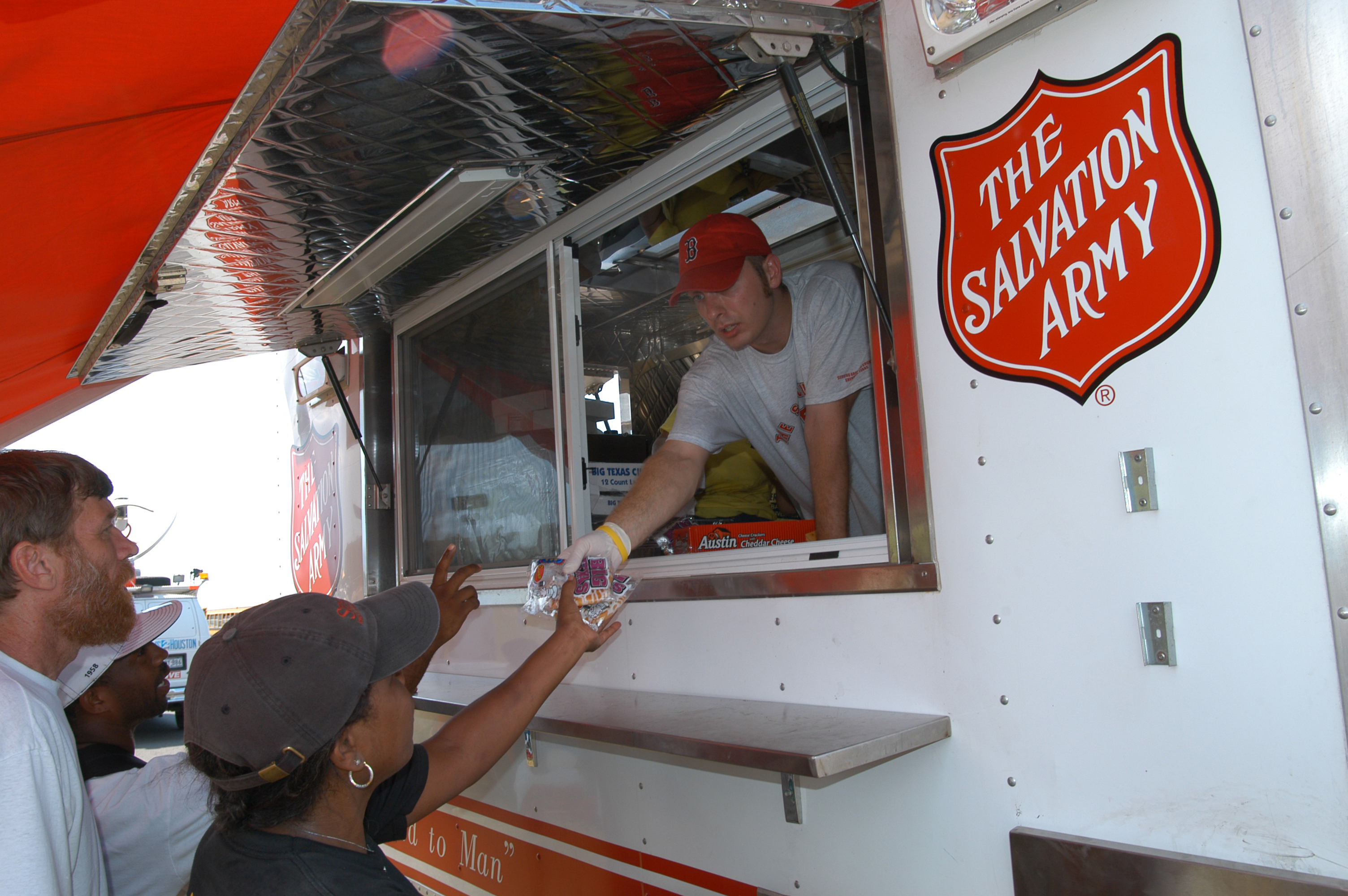
An evacuee is given food by a Salvation Army volunteer

The Salvation Army responded to the immediate needs of the survivors. Eventually 5.6 million meals were served, 3.3 million people were assisted, and nearly $400 million donated. The Army's immediate response to Hurricane Katrina included the mobilization of more than 178 canteen feeding units and 11 field kitchens which together have served more than 5.7 million hot meals, 8.3 million sandwiches, snacks & drinks. Its SATERN (Salvation Army Team Emergency Radio Network) network of amateur ham-radio operators picked up where modern communications left off to help locate more than 25,000 survivors. And, The Salvation Army pastoral care counselors were on hand to comfort the emotional and spiritual needs of 277,000 individuals.

The New York Regional Association of Grantmakers (now Philanthropy New York) published a Donors' Guide for individuals and organizations looking for philanthropic options for Gulf Coast recovery

In addition to the Red Cross, numerous charity and relief organizations stepped up their activities to aid hurricane victims. The United Methodist Church provided volunteers to help muck out homes and rebuild affected areas. According to the church's volunteer service arm, UMVIM, over thirty thousand United Methodist volunteers have worked in the affected areas since Katrina. Southern Baptist Disaster Relief mobilized hundreds of units from across the US. Southern Baptist Disaster relief staffed massive feeding units, shower and laundry facilities, assessment teams, Mud-Out, and chainsaw and debris removal teams across the affected area. The Catholic Charities activated a disaster response plan. The plan targeted areas outside of the disaster that are providing refugee relief and agencies located in or nearby are mobilizing to assist the needy. Operation Blessing began organizing to ship food and relief supplies into the affected areas, as it has done in disaster zones around the world before. America's Second Harvest, a food bank that operates in many communities, began coordinating efforts to ship food donations to coastal areas. Habitat for Humanity announced plans to check on all Habitat-built homes and their residents, and then turn to providing assistance to Habitat families, partners, and volunteers in need of help. The American Public School Endowments began collecting funds to rebuild schools in the affected area, and to aid schools suffering from an onslaught of refugees. Mercy Corps is accepting donations and sending a team of emergency relief experts to the Gulf region to offer financial and technical assistance for immediate and longer-term relief and recovery efforts. Conservative Mennonites sent many volunteer laborers to help with cleaning and rebuilding of homes affected.

Other nonprofit non-governmental organizations that are helping like the ASPCA are listed on Network for Good's website. Jehovah's Witnesses are responding by giving much food, water, clothing, and financial aid to victims. The Church of Jesus Christ of Latter-day Saints is also responding to the devastation. While emergency services and rescue personnel work on relief operations in New Orleans, they are at high risk of disease. The Family International has mobilized Christian Counsellors to provide spiritual healing, comfort and encouragement to the evacuees throughout Louisiana, Texas and Mississippi and have launched Katrina Relief Home to share the needs of the victims of this disaster.

The KatrinaHelp wiki is a grassroots effort collating all refugee records from a variety of sites (including Craigslist, et al.) in PFIF format; they offer a search interface for their database.

The first Pfif spinoff is SFIF (Shelter Finder Interface format), a clone of Pfif where elements and attributes have been adapted to model shelter entities developed by Shelterfinder an interactive database where a list of active shelters is maintained by volunteers

Awake In America, a non-profit organization based in Philadelphia, launched "Operation Restore CPAP" to get equipment to treat sleep apnea in victims of Hurricane Katrina who had been previously diagnosed with sleep apnea.

Hands On USA, now Hands On Gulf Coast, was on the ground in Gulfport and Biloxi a week after the storm. Founded in Thailand after the 2004 Tsunami, Hands On has evolved from immediate relief services, to recovery operations such as gutting houses and taking trees off houses, to community empowerment and redevelopment. They are based out of the Beauvoir Methodist Church in Biloxi, MS, although they also have satellite locations in New Orleans and Bay St. Louis.

The Common Ground Collective is a local, community-run organization offering assistance, mutual aid and support to New Orleans communities that have been historically neglected and underserved. Common Ground's efforts include acting as a hub for medical and health providers, aid workers, community organizers, legal representatives as well as people with a variety of skills. The Common Ground collective also has been part of organizing the "Road Trip for Relief", a grassroots effort to bus 300 volunteers into New Orleans.

Emergency Communities is a non-profit organization that employs compassion and creativity to provide community-based disaster relief. Since Katrina, they have operated four relief sites, served over 300,000 meals and 25,000 residents of the Gulf. They are a United Way Partner Agency and currently run operations in Buras, LA and the Ninth Ward.

The Welcome Home Kitchen is serving three meals a day to over 700 people, as well as providing free medical care, a distribution center of clothing and supplies, a community bulletin board and an information table. The Welcome Home Kitchen is facilitated by The Rainbow Family of Living Light as well as Katrina Alliance.

World Shelters Task Force One operated in Hancock County, MS from September 15, 2005, until October 26, 2005, and deployed 80 shelter structures for relief efforts and housing. Remaining supplies and equipment went on to be used by Burners Without Borders, with support from The Buckminster Fuller Institute.

Camp Restore began on September 10, 2006, and has since provided shelter to over 3,500 volunteers as they rebuilt hundreds of homes that had been destroyed by the hurricane. The operation is based in East New Orleans and was started in part by the Lutheran Church–Missouri Synod.

The Chabad Lubavitch movement sent in rescue teams to evacuate people from the city and provided meals and shelter to evacuees. Chabad communities in Florida, California, Tennessee, Texas, and many other states made short and long term arrangements for many Jewish New Orleanians. Families were also provided with financial help and volunteers were arranged to help with the clean-up efforts

The Unitarian Universalist church organized a Gulf Coast Relief Fund which aided survivors in Plaquemines Parish.

=== In Film ===
- Waveland MissaHippie- 2005
- Common Ground Collective: Solidarity Not Charity- 2005

== International response ==
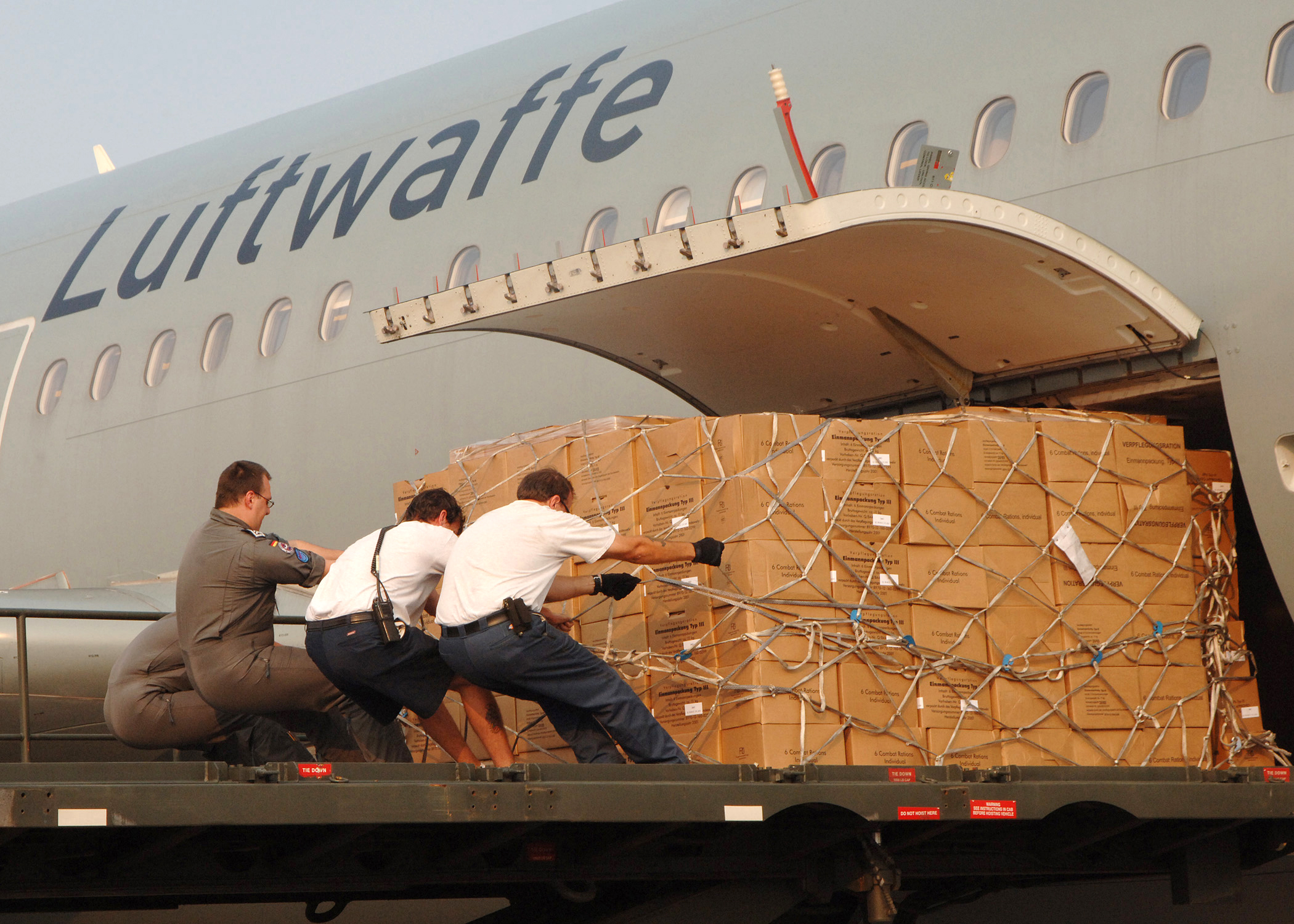
Crew members of a German Air Force A-310 aircraft offload Meals Ready-to-Eat (MRE) on board Naval Air Station Pensacola, Florida, in support of Hurricane Katrina relief efforts

Initially, the United States had been reluctant to accept donations and aid from foreign countries. However, this policy was reversed, and as the reports of damage grew more grim, the United States accepted the foreign aid. Countries and organizations that offered to send aid mentioned by the State Department included the European Union, NATO, Organization of American States, OPEC, United Kingdom, the United Nations, United Nations High Commissioner for Refugees, and the World Health Organization, as well as almost 100 countries.

Donations include Kuwait donating 500 million dollars, Canada sending frigate HMCS Toronto and frigate HMCS Ville de Québec, a coast guard light icebreaker (CCGS Sir William Alexander), and two Sikorsky CH-124 Sea King helicopters to the area (2 additional helicopters were sent to Boston to replace US Coast Guard helicopters going to Louisiana) and Singapore sending three CH-47 Chinook helicopters and thirty-eight RSAF personnel from a training detachment based in Grand Prairie, Texas. Some of these countries that helped even offered evacuees to immigrate to their respective countries.

Notable offers from international organizations include the United Nations, which was ready to send supply high-energy biscuits, generators, planes, tents along with experienced staff members; and Paris-based International Energy Agency agreeing to make 60 million barrels oil available to help the United States weather the economic problems caused by Hurricane Katrina.

== Cultural and sporting responses ==
The National Hockey League, along with the National Hockey League Players' Association, have donated $1 million. An auction of game worn jerseys, from the 2005–06 NHL season opening night, will also be held. The National Football League donated $1 million, as did the New York Yankees baseball organization. The New York Jets and New York Giants also allowed the 2005 LSU Tigers football team play their home games at Giants Stadium while both the Mercedes-Benz Superdome and the Pete Maravich Assembly Center were being used as a refuge for victims of the hurricane, and Tiger Stadium (LSU) was being used by the New Orleans Saints for their home games. A Concert for Hurricane Relief, an hour-long, music and celebrity driven broadcast was aired on September 2, 2005, by NBC. Shelter from the Storm: A Concert for the Gulf Coast, an hour long simulcast benefit concert aired on September 9, 2005, worldwide. A four and a half-hour long benefit concert titled ReAct Now: Music & Relief was broadcast by MTV, VH1 and CMT on September 10, 2005. Céline Dion, the Canadian singer, also donated $1 million.

== Scam artist responses ==
In the wake of a large outpouring of support, many scam artists took advantage of the public's willingness to provide money and other resources to victims of the hurricane. The FBI reported that over 500 illegitimate websites were created to collect money that ostensibly would go to hurricane victims. Spam emails were then circulated to attract donations.

== See also ==
- Charity Navigator offers a detailed report on the Charitable Response to Katrina
- International response to Hurricane Katrina
- Criticism of the government response to Hurricane Katrina
