= People finder =

People Finder, PeopleFinder or PeopleFinders may refer to:

- Google Person Finder, web application from Google
- Katrina PeopleFinder, an online project setup in the aftermath of Hurricane Katrina
- peopleFinders.com, an American public records company

== See also ==
- Missing person
- People Finder Interchange Format (PFIF)
- People search site
