= Elomia Health =

Elomia Health, Inc.
- Type: Private
- Industry: Mental health care Artificial intelligence
- Founded: 2019 in Kharkiv, Ukraine
- Headquarters: San Francisco, California, United States
- Number of employees: 11–50
- Website: https://elomia.com

Elomia Health, Inc. is a private technology company developing AI-powered conversational tools for mental health support.

== History ==
Elomia Health traces its roots to 2018, when its founder began developing his first mental health startup, laying the groundwork for later AI-driven work. In 2021, academic research reported that regular use of the Elomia chatbot was associated with reductions in symptoms such as depression and anxiety. In 2022, Elomia released its mobile application.

In September 2024, Elomia Health was named one of 24 startups selected for the Google for Startups Ukraine Support Fund, a program highlighting startups fueling Ukraine's future, as announced at the Lviv IT Arena event. The company was also accepted into the Social Tides program funded by Google.org.

Later in October 2024, the children's mental health chatbot Troodi, developed by Elomia Health in partnership with Troomi Wireless and built to provide age‑appropriate conversational support, was discussed in The Wall Street Journal and other publications as an example of AI‑powered mental‑health assistance embedded on child‑focused mobile devices. Following this coverage, Troomi Wireless made Troodi available on its devices, with media reports noting its growing use among adolescents across the United States.

In 2025, academic research continued to examine the impact of AI‑integrated mental health tools, including Elomia, on psychological outcomes; for example, a quasi‑experimental study published in BMC Psychology reported that interventions incorporating the Elomia chatbot were associated with reductions in symptoms such as anxiety and depression among student participants, highlighting ongoing research interest in generative AI applications for mental well‑being.

== Activities ==
Elomia Health develops and provides AI‑powered mental health support through conversational chatbot technology designed with input from clinicians and informed by evidence‑based psychological practices.

The main product is the Elomia App, a chatbot available 24/7 that incorporates techniques from cognitive behavioral therapy (CBT), acceptance and commitment therapy (ACT), and dialectical behavior therapy (DBT). The company also offers the Elomia API, enabling third‑party platforms to integrate the chatbot into their services.
