= Google Crisis Response =

Team within Google.org

Google Crisis Response is a team within Google.org that "seeks to make critical information more accessible around natural disasters and humanitarian crises". The team has responded in the past to the 2010 Haiti earthquake, 2010 Pakistan floods, 2010–11 Queensland floods, February 2011 Christchurch earthquake, and the 2011 Tōhoku earthquake and tsunami among other events, using Google resources and tools such as Google Maps, Google Earth, Google Person Finder, and Google Fusion Tables.

== About ==
Google Crisis Response organizes emergency alerts and news updates relating to a crisis and publishes the information on its web properties or dedicated landing pages. It also provides opportunities for donation in collaboration with agencies like UNICEF, Save the Children, International Medical Corps, and local relief-providing bodies. Google also builds and provides tools to help crisis responders and affected people communicate and stay informed, such as Google Person Finder, Google Crisis Map, Google Public Alerts, Google Maps, Google Earth, Google Fusion Tables, Google Docs, and Google Sites.

== Tools ==
=== Google Person Finder ===
Google Person Finder helps in locating missing persons. It acts as a message board for survivors, families and friends of those affected in a natural disaster by putting in live updates about missing persons. During the 2011 Tōhoku earthquake and tsunami, several Japanese family members were able to locate each other using Google Person Finder.

=== Google Maps ===
Google Maps supplies critical crisis information to the public through search engines. It is used to provide crisis information such as road closure, areas covered in debris, roads which are passable, and resources such as for emergency medical stations. Using the My Map feature, KPBS, a broadcast station, created a map which provided real-time updates on the San Diego wildfires in 2007. The map received more than two million views within a couple of days. Google Maps was used to track the path of Hurricane Irene which hit the US eastern coast in August 2011. Besides mapping, Google Maps also displayed 3–5 day forecasts for Hurricane Irene, showed evacuation routes, and marked out the coastal areas that were in danger of the impending storm surge.

=== Google Earth ===
Google Earth is a virtual globe that allows extensive customization with editing tools to draw shapes, add text, and integrate live feeds for information on earthquakes, cyclones, landslides, and oil spills as they occur. During the 2010 Haiti earthquake, International Medical Corps and Doctors Without Borders used the Google Earth application to track response efforts and visualise cholera case origins.

=== Google Fusion Tables ===
Google Fusion Tables is an application which gathers, visualises, and shares data online with response organisations and constituents. It instantly visualises the data ranging from shelter lists to power outages in the form of maps and charts. It also helps in playing a crucial role in crisis decision making by identifying data patterns. During the 2011 riots in London, this application was used in creating maps which showed indices of deprivation and riot locations.

=== Google Sites ===
Google Sites facilitates creation and updates of a website with critical response information available from anywhere in the globe at any point of time. Its highlight being that it can be created or updated without the help of web developers or any knowledge of HTML programming making it easier to use. A variety of information can be put up like forms to collect information, videos of the crisis, photos of the devastation, and maps that protect important natural resources and that help in search and rescue operations. Save the Children, an independent organization involved in rescue of children in case of natural calamities, has been regularly using this application.

== Donations ==
Google.org, the philanthropic arm of Google, has donated several million dollars to the different relief organizations during natural disasters such as Hurricane Katrina and Cyclone Nargis.
