= Google.org =

Charitable arm of Google

- Formation: October 2005; 20 years ago
- Director: Jacquelline Fuller
- Parent organization: Google
- Website: google.org

Google.org, founded in October 2005, is the charitable arm of Google, a multinational technology company. The organization has committed roughly US$100 million in investments and grants to nonprofits annually.

The organization is noted for several significant grants to nonprofits using technology and data in innovative ways to support racial justice, educational opportunity, crisis response after health epidemics and natural disasters, and issues affecting the San Francisco Bay Area community where it is headquartered. It also hosts regular challenges around the world to stimulate innovative uses of technologies to address local challenges.

== Overview ==
The mission and approach of Google.org has seen multiple iterations over the years, an approach that mirrors other divisions within Google in its effort to reallocate resources towards the most significant and effective methods. The organization's general strategy involves funding the use of technology, data, and user-centered design to make a better world, faster.

Google.org is considered a part of Google, as opposed to an Alphabet organization, under the formation of the Alphabet parent company in 2016. To fund the organization, Google granted three million shares during their initial public offering (IPO). In 2014, the corporation stated on its website that it donates $100,000,000 in grants, 200,000 hours, and $1 billion in products each year.

== Major initiatives ==
As of 2016, Google has focused a majority of its efforts on a few key topics, based upon a premise of equality and opportunity. In 2024, Google.org launched the Google.org Accelerator: Generative AI, a six-month program providing funding, technical assistance, and Google engineering support to nonprofits building generative AI tools for social impact. The inaugural cohort included 21 organizations whose projects are projected to reach more than 30 million people over three years.

=== Racial Justice ===
It is the first major corporate philanthropy organization to allocate funding to combat against racial inequality in the United States, and has funded organizations such as Bryan Stevenson's Equal Justice Initiative, the ACLU, the Ella Baker Center, and Beyond 12. In 2017, Google pledged $11 million in grants to several organizations in connection with racial bias.

=== Education and Digital Skills ===
In addition, Google.org funds education, economic development, and digital literacy related projects in a number of regions.

=== Disabilities ===
In previous years, Google has funded a number of other areas. In 2015 they announced a $20M effort to use technology to improve opportunity and equality for people with disabilities, one of the few portfolios focused on this segment of the population. Some noted as a unique lens to philanthropy, and a subject area that affects roughly 1 in 7 people across the world. The grant making initiative resulted in a diverse array of grants, including 3D printed prosthetic for landmine victims and children with limb differences, beacon-powered navigation tools for the visually impaired, data analytics projects to surface better tools and aids for people with cognitive disabilities, and better bracing and compliance systems for children with clubfoot. This portfolio ended in 2015.

=== Crisis Response ===
Google.org has also responded to crises around the world, with giving initiatives addressing challenges with the European refugee crisis in 2016, the Ebola crisis in 2014, and the Nepal earthquake in 2015. In many instances, it has been one of the largest corporate donors. The organization also gave $250,000 to organizations working to serve residents affected by the Flint water crisis. In August 2017, the company donated $250,000 to the Red Cross relief fund for Hurricane Harvey.

=== AI and Social Good ===
AI for Social Good is a group of researchers, engineers, volunteers, and other people across Google with a shared focus on positive social impact.

Google.org and Google in general has also been supportive of a number of causes, including LGBT rights, veterans affairs, digital literacy, and refugee rights.

== Previous initiatives ==
Previous incarnations of Google.org took different approaches, usually focused on technology applied to social sphere, in keeping with the company's brand around technology and innovation.

Among its first projects was a mass-produced plug-in hybrid electric vehicle that can attain 100 mpg (miles per gallon) (see vehicle-to-grid).

In November 2007, Google.org announced RE<C (Renewable Energy Cheaper Than Coal), a project that will invest several hundred million dollars in order to produce renewable energy at a profit from wind and solar sources, particularly solar thermal energy. RE<C has the ultimate goal of creating more than a gigawatt of power (enough to power a city the size of San Francisco) from renewable sources that would be cheaper than energy produced from coal.

The director from 2006 until 2009 was Dr. Larry Brilliant. Upon stepping down, Brilliant was replaced by Megan Smith, Google's vice-president of new business development, and the organization began focusing on creating engineering solutions to global problems with projects such as Google Flu Trends and Crisis Response, an effort to respond to natural disasters. Megan Smith later left to join the office of the CTO under the Obama administration, at which point Google.org began focusing exclusively on its charitable giving initiatives under the stewardship of Jacquelline Fuller, who currently runs the organization.

In 2010, Google gave over $145 million to non-profits and academic institutions. In the same year, Google was named the Bay Area's top corporate philanthropist by the San Francisco Business Times for giving $27.6 million to Bay Area charities. The company has won the same award for a number of years since, including as recently as 2016 Charitable funds come from Google.org, the Google Foundation and the company itself.

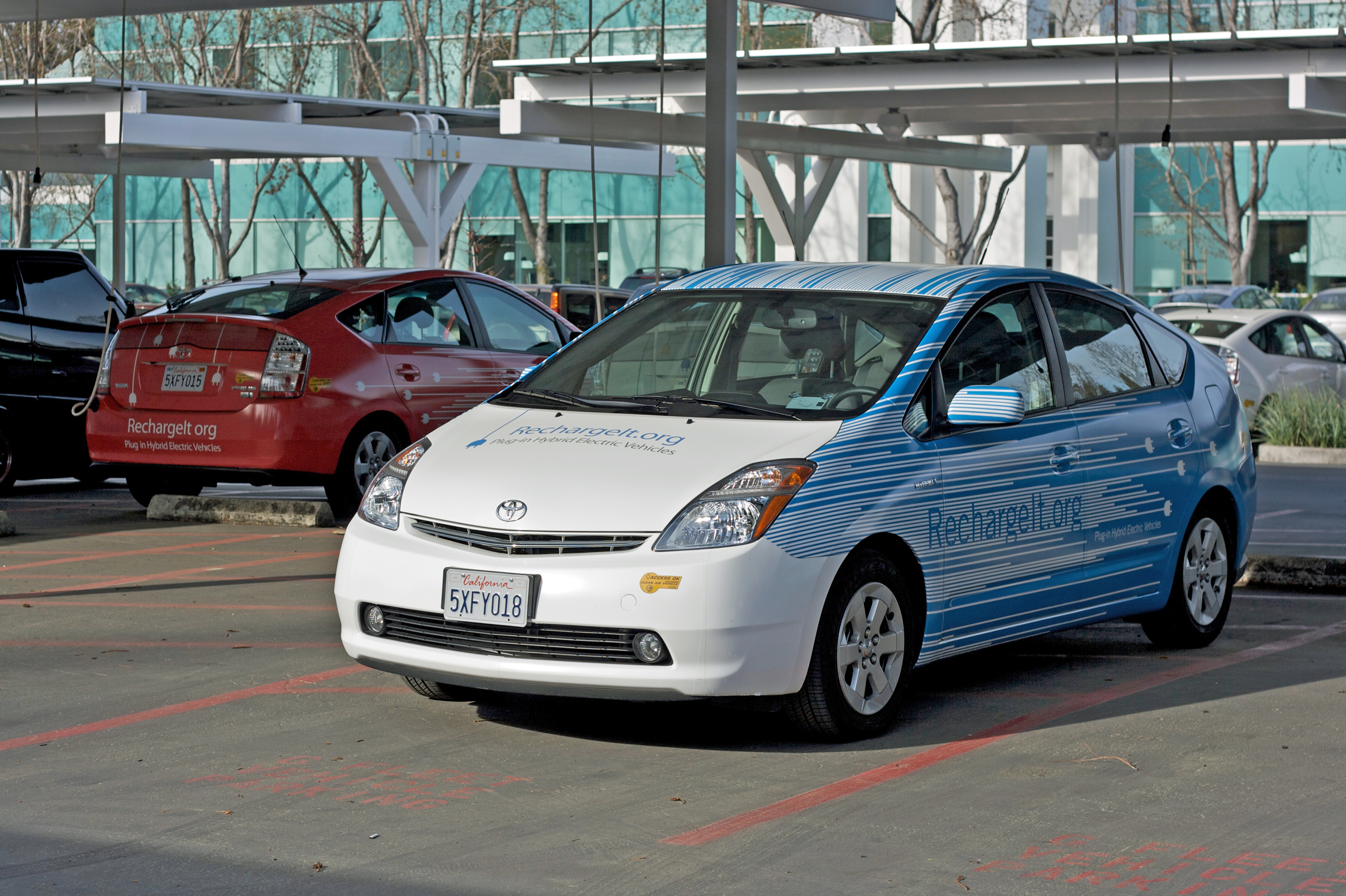
RechargeIT plug-in hybrids converted Toyota Prius at Google's Mountain View campus.

A new project started in June 2014 is Made with Code, uses coding programs to allow girls to become interested in the idea of coding and develop more female programmers over time.

Google.org's major projects in 2012 included:

- Google Crisis Response which includes: Google Person Finder, Google Public Alerts, and Google Crisis Maps, all supporting disaster relief efforts with critical tools and information.
- Google Flu & Dengue Trends showing near real-time estimates of disease activity, based on aggregated search results
- Google for Nonprofits providing free or discounted access to some additional Google products for nonprofit organizations.

Pre-2012 Google.org projects included:

- Develop renewable energy cheaper than coal (RE<C): create utility-scale electricity from clean renewable energy sources that is cheaper than electricity produced from coal. This project began in 2007 and was dropped in 2011. Though technical advancements resulted, it did not meet its ambitious goal.
- Accelerate the commercialization of plug-in electric vehicles (RechargeIT): seed innovation, demonstrate technology, inform the debate, and stimulate market demand to foster mass commercialization of plug-in vehicles.
- Predict and Prevent: identify "hot spots" and enable rapid response to emerging threats, such as infectious disease and climate risk.
- Inform and Empower to Improve Public Services: use information to empower citizens and communities, providers, and policymakers to improve the delivery of essential public services (such as education, health, water and sanitation) in the developing world.
- Fuel the Growth of Small and Medium-Sized Enterprises: increase the flow of risk capital to small and medium-sized businesses in the developing world.

== Renewable energy ==
In 2008, Google.org joined a number of renewable energy initiatives, including:

- investing $130 million in eSolar for solar thermal plants.
- presenting at the Renewable Energy Finance Forum-Wall Street, held June 18–19, 2008 at the Waldorf-Astoria Hotel. Google.org Climate Change and Energy Initiatives Director, Dan Reicher, will chair the opening remarks.
- investing $10 million in Makani Power for kite systems that tap into jet streams.
- filing a patent application for floating data centers powered by wave power.
- invested in AltaRock Energy, first U.S. demonstration project of Enhanced Geothermal Systems to create renewable energy through geothermal power.

Google.org began moving away from renewable energy initiatives between 2010 and 2013, as Google opted to bring its renewable energy work into formal product areas under the leadership of Larry Alder and Craig Barratt. A retrospective on leanings from this effort was published in IEEE Spectrum as What it Would Really Take to Reverse Climate Change.

== See also ==
- Google PowerMeter
- Low cost solar cell
- The Final Inch
- Vehicle-to-grid
- World Day Against Cyber Censorship, Netizen Prize
