= Facebook Safety Check =

Feature managed by the social networking company Facebook

Facebook Safety Check activated for Facebook users surrounding the 2017 London Bridge attack, United Kingdom

Facebook Safety Check (sometimes called Facebook Crisis Response) is a feature managed by the social networking company Facebook. The feature is activated by the company during natural or man-made disasters and terror-related incidents to quickly determine whether people in the affected geographical area are safe.

== History ==
=== Release ===
The feature was developed by Facebook engineers, inspired by people's use of social media to connect with friends and family in the wake of the 2011 Tōhoku earthquake and tsunami. Originally named the Disaster Message Board, it was renamed to Safety Check prior to release. It was introduced on October 15, 2014. Its first major deployment was on Saturday, April 25, 2015, in the wake of the April 2015 Nepal earthquake. The tool was deployed again in the wake of the May 2015 Nepal earthquake, during Pacific Hurricane Patricia in October 2015, and during the November 2015 Paris attacks, the latter being the first time the tool was used in response to a non-natural disaster. On March 22, 2016, during reports of explosions at an airport and train station in Brussels, the feature was turned on again, but there was a delay in turning it on after it was revealed it was a suicide bomber attack.

On June 2, 2016, Facebook announced that it would start experimenting with community-activated Safety Checks. With the new system, Safety Check would be activated based on combination of a certain number of people posting about a particular crisis plus an alert from one of Facebook's third-party sources. Users would also be able to share and spread the word about the Safety Check once it was activated. Facebook hoped the changes would lead to more consistent, frequent, and streamlined deployments around the world.

On February 8, 2017, Facebook introduced a Community Help feature to the Safety Check crisis response tool. It allows users to search through categorized posts, offer local assistance, and connect with providers over Facebook Messenger. In June 2017, Facebook announced several updates to Safety Check, including the Community Help feature coming to desktops. It was also made possible for users to start fundraisers from within Safety Check.

=== Deployment in the context of the Nepal earthquake ===
On Saturday, April 25, 2015, an earthquake struck Nepal, with an estimated loss of a few thousand lives. Within a few hours of the earthquake hitting, Facebook had activated Safety Check in the region. It identified users as possibly being in the affected area by their current city as listed on their profile, as well as the place from which they had most recently accessed Facebook. The desktop version of Safety Check also provided a brief synopsis of the event and emergency contact numbers.

During the activation more than 7 million people in the affected area were marked safe, which generated notifications to over 150 million friends on the platform.

The tool was deployed again in the wake of the May 2015 Nepal earthquake, and received attention when some people outside the affected area were reported by Facebook as marked safe.

=== Deployment during November Paris attacks ===
Facebook deployed the feature during November 2015 Paris attacks. This was the first time Facebook activated the feature for a violent attack (or any non-natural disaster), mentioning that the policy for activation and the product itself is an ongoing work in progress.

=== Other deployments ===
Location	Event	Reference	Notes
Nigeria	Boko Haram bombings (late November 2015)		Announcing the activation on his Facebook timeline, Facebook CEO Mark Zuckerberg wrote that unfortunately, incidents like this were all too common and he would not announce individual activations of Safety Check in the future. However, he urged people to be optimistic and realize that the frequency of such incidents was going down on the whole.
Chennai, India	2015 South Indian floods		
Ankara, Turkey	February 2016 Ankara bombing		First operational use in Turkey.
Ankara, Turkey	March 2016 Ankara bombing		
Brussels, Belgium	2016 Brussels bombings (March 22, 2016)		
Lahore, Pakistan	2016 Lahore bombing		Facebook accidentally sent notifications asking whether users were safe to Facebook users around the world, even those who were nowhere near Pakistan.
Orlando area, Florida, United States	Orlando nightclub shooting (June 12, 2016)		First operational use in the United States.
Antananarivo, Madagascar	Explosion in Mahamasina Municipal Stadium, Antananarivo (June 26, 2016)		
Istanbul, Turkey	2016 Atatürk Airport attack		
Dallas, Texas, United States	2016 shooting of Dallas police officers		
Nice, France	2016 Nice truck attack		
Munich, Germany	2016 Munich shooting at OEZ (July 22, 2016)		
Quetta, Pakistan	8 August 2016 Quetta bombing		
Gothenburg, Sweden	Hand grenade attack on apartment building that killed an 8-year-old boy (August 22, 2016)		
Central Italy	August 2016 Central Italy earthquake (August 24, 2016)		
Tel Aviv, Israel	Tel Aviv building collapse (September 5, 2016)		Facebook activated it in a small distribution as a pilot in order to expand the feature.
Davao City, Philippines	2016 Davao City bombing (September 2, 2016)		
New York City, United States	2016 Chelsea bombing		
Hoboken, New Jersey, United States	2016 Hoboken train crash at Hoboken Terminal (September 29, 2016)		
Brussels, Belgium	2016 stabbing of Brussels police officers (October 5, 2016)		
Kaikōura, Blenheim, Christchurch, Wellington, New Zealand.	2016 Kaikōura earthquake (November 14, 2016)		
Haifa, Israel	November 2016 Israel fires (November 24, 2016)		First operational use in Israel.
Columbus, Ohio, United States	Ohio State University attack (November 28, 2016)		
Gatlinburg, Tennessee, United States	2016 Wildfire in Gatlinburg area (November 28, 2016)		
Oakland, California, United States	2016 Oakland warehouse fire (December 2, 2016)		
Cambridge, Massachusetts, United States	10-Alarm fire in residential neighborhood (December 4, 2016)		
Chennai, India	Cyclone Vardah hits India (December 12, 2016)		
Gothenburg, Sweden	Hand grenade attack on apartment building (December 15, 2016)		
Berlin, Germany	2016 Berlin truck attack (December 19, 2016)		
Jerusalem	January 2017 Jerusalem vehicular attack (January 8, 2017)		
Jersey Village, Texas, United States	Jersey Village tornado (January 16, 2017)		
Playa del Carmen, Mexico	Playa del Carmen violent incident (January 16, 2017)		First operational use in Mexico
Christchurch, New Zealand	Port Hills wildfire (February 13, 2017)		
London, United Kingdom	2017 Westminster attack (March 22, 2017)		
Saint-Petersburg, Russia	2017 Saint Petersburg Metro attack (April 3, 2017)		First operational use in Russia
Stockholm, Sweden	2017 Stockholm truck attack (April 7, 2017)		
Manchester, England	Manchester Arena bombing (May 22, 2017)		
Jakarta, Indonesia	2017 Kampung Melayu bombings (May 24, 2017)		First operational use in Indonesia
Pernambuco, Brazil	2017 Pernambuco and Alagoas floods (May 27, 2017)		
London, England	2017 London Bridge attack (June 3, 2017)		
Cape Town, South Africa	June 2017 storm		First operational use in South Africa
Knysna, South Africa	June 2017 wildfires		
London, England	Grenfell Tower fire (June 14, 2017)		
Split, Croatia	Split wildfire (June 16–18, 2017)		First operational use in Croatia
Barcelona, Spain	2017 Barcelona attacks (August 17, 2017)		First operational use in Spain
Turku, Finland	Turku stabbing (August 18, 2017)		First operational use in Finland
Hong Kong and Macao	Typhoon Hato (August 22, 2017)		First operational use in Hong Kong and Macao
Romania	Western Romania storm (September 17, 2017)		First operational use in Romania
Las Vegas, Nevada, United States	2017 Las Vegas shooting (October 1, 2017)		
Czech Republic, Germany, Poland	Storm Herwart (October 29, 2017)		
Surabaya, Indonesia	2018 Surabaya bombings (May 13, 2018)		
Lombok, Indonesia	August 2018 Lombok earthquake (August 5, 2018)		
Utrecht, Netherlands	Utrecht tram shooting (March 18, 2019)		First operational use in the Netherlands
Australia	2019–20 Australian bushfire season		
Jakarta, Indonesia	2020 Greater Jakarta flooding (January 1, 2020)		
Jakarta, Indonesia	January 2020 Jakarta floods		
Bandung Regency, Indonesia	January 2020 Bandung floods		
Houston, Texas, US	January 2020 Houston explosions		
Zagreb, Croatia	2020 Zagreb earthquake (March 22, 2020)		
Southern Brazil	June 2020 Brazil bomb cyclone		
Beirut, Lebanon	2020 Beirut explosion (August 4, 2020)		First operational use in Lebanon
California, US	2020 California wildfires		
Oregon, US	2020 Oregon wildfires		
Philippines	Typhoon Rolly (October 2020)		
Malaysia	2020–21 Malaysian floods		
Gjerdrum, Norway	2020 Gjerdrum landslide (December 30, 2020)		
Valparaíso, Chile	Valparaíso wildfires (January 2021)		
Madrid, Spain	2021 Madrid explosion (January 20, 2021)		
Tétouan, Morocco	Tétouan floods (March 2021)		First operational use in Morocco
Béjaïa, Algeria	2021 Béjaïa earthquake (March 18, 2021)		First operational use in Algeria
Santiago, Nuevo León, Mexico	Nuevo León wildfires (March 2021)		
Saint Vincent and the Grenadines	2021 eruption of La Soufrière (April 2021)		First operational use in Saint Vincent and the Grenadines

== Reception ==
=== Reception upon release ===
Upon the release of Safety Check, Richard Lawler wrote in Engadget praising the tool, writing "[I]t can take some pressure off of overloaded infrastructure with everyone trying to call affected areas after disasters hit, and of course, save you from a post-tragedy chewing out for failure to let people know you're fine." On the flip side, he posited that Safety Check might be "a cagey way to try to take some of the creepiness out of the apps' location tracking features".

=== Reception of deployment for April 2015 Nepal earthquake ===
Commentators praised Facebook Safety Check in the wake of the April 2015 Nepal earthquake and compared it to Google Person Finder, a tool by Google with a similar purpose. However, commentators noted that due to low penetration of mobile devices and poor network connectivity in the region (which had worsened due to the earthquake), many of the people in the target audience of the tool would not be able to use it. This was likened to similar problems faced by Google Person Finder during the 2010 Pakistan floods.

=== Reception of deployment for May 2015 Nepal earthquake ===
After the May 2015 Nepal earthquake, BuzzFeed reported that many users outside the geographical area affected by the earthquake were marking themselves as safe using the tool, and that this was angering other users who thought they were being insensitive to the toll and tragedy of the event. The story was picked up by other publications including the Huffington Post and fact-checking website Snopes, which noted that this was due to a bug in Facebook leading it to prompt people outside the affected area to confirm whether they were safe.

=== In popular culture ===
The Safety Check graphic has been widely parodied as the "Marked Safe" meme template, in which users jokingly declare themselves safe from trivial day-to-day annoyances.

== See also ==
- Google Person Finder
