= Google Public Alerts =

Online notification service owned by Google.org

Google Public Alerts Site
- Website type: Weather and safety alerting site
- Dissolved: 31 March 2021; 5 years ago
- Owner: Google.org
- Website: google.org/publicalerts
- Launched: 30 October 2012; 13 years ago

Google Public Alerts Site was an online notification service owned by Google.org that sends safety alerts (weather watches, warnings, advisories, safety instructions, etc.) and launched to the United States, Australia, Canada, Colombia, Japan, Taiwan, Indonesia, Mexico, and Brazil on October 30, 2012, and to the Philippines on November 12, 2014. It is part of the Google Crisis Response team and publishes content from its partners of each country. If you activate Google Now, you can see suitable weather and public safety on Google Search and Google Maps.

On June 3, 2014, Public Alerts connected with Twitter to display tweets about the current event to keep people safe via special sources. Google called it "extreme public alerts" because it can answer questions, such as whether schools are closed. Google says "it's only enabled in majorly English-speaking countries".

Google Public Alerts Site was discontinued by Google.org on March 31, 2021, though the functionality will be available on other Google services such as Google Search and Google Maps.

== Partners ==
=== United States ===
- National Weather Service
- United States Geological Survey
- West Coast and Alaska Tsunami Warning Center
- Amber alerts from the National Center for Missing and Exploited Children
- Nixle (Now: Everbridge)

=== Australia ===
- New South Wales Rural Fire Service

=== Canada ===
- Environment and Climate Change Canada

=== England ===
- Environment Agency

=== Germany ===
- Deutscher Wetterdienst

=== Colombia ===
- Unidad Nacional para la Gestión del Riesgo de Desastres (National Unit for Disaster Risk Management)
- Instituto de Hidrología, Meteorología y Estudios Ambientales (Institute of Hydrology, Meteorology and Environmental Studies)

=== Japan ===
- Japan Meteorological Agency

=== Taiwan ===
- Central Weather Bureau
- Water Resource Agency
- Soil and Water Conversation Bureau
- Directorate General of Highways
- National Science and Technology Center for Disaster Reduction

=== Indonesia ===
- Badan Meteorologi, Klimatologi, dan Geofisika (Indonesian Agency for Meteorology, Climatology and Geophysics)
- Badan Nasional Penanggulangan Bencana (Indonesian National Board for Disaster Management)

=== Mexico ===
- Servicio Meteorológico Nacional (National Weather Service)

=== Philippines ===
- PAG-ASA (Philippine Atmospheric, Geophysical and Astronomical Services Administration)
