= Jacquelline Fuller =

American executive and philanthropist

Jacquelline Fuller is an American executive and philanthropist known for her work at Google. She led the company’s charitable arm, Google.org. Fuller also worked for the Bill and Melinda Gates Foundation as its Deputy Director of Global Health.

== Biography ==
In an interview, Fuller revealed that her father was a diplomat and she grew up intending to follow in his footsteps. She majored in arms control for her undergraduate degree for this purpose. However, she shifted her focus to urban poverty after living in Los Angeles and volunteering in her neighborhood. She completed a Political Science degree from the University of California, Los Angeles (UCLA) and obtained her Master’s in Public Policy from Harvard’s Kennedy School.

After graduation, Fuller was employed as a staff member in the office of Kay Coles James, who was then the Assistant Secretary for Public Affairs during the first Bush administration. Later, Fuller would become one of the ghostwriters for James’ autobiography, Never Forget. She then joined the Health and Human Services (HHS), where she eventually was promoted as a speech writer for Louis Sullivan, the HHS Secretary.

=== Philanthropy ===
Around 1999, Fuller joined the Bill & Melinda Gates Foundation, where she would work for eight years. She became the organization’s Deputy Director of Global Health, steering its global health initiatives. One of her notable works was the launch of the foundation’s $300 million AIDS initiative, which required her and her family to live in India for a year.

She departed the Gates Foundation to work for Google.org. This was in 2007, a time when Fuller described the organization and even the search engine company itself as startups. By 2021, she was the President of Google.org and a Vice President at Google. She was now in charge of one of the world’s largest corporate giving programs. Under her leadership, the organization was able to give away $1 billion in five years, funding nonprofits involved in racial equity, economic empowerment, access to quality education and global COVID-19 responses, among others. For example, in 2017, she launched Google's $50 million initiative that supported groups helping people find jobs.
