= Awake In America =

Non-profit organization focused on sleeping issues

Awake In America is a Pennsylvania-based national non-profit organization (501(c)(3)) focused on sleep and sleep hygiene, sleep-related issues, including sleep deprivation, shift work sleep disorder, insomnia, as well as sleep disorders, including sleep apnea, narcolepsy, sleep disorders and potential health issues, restless legs syndrome, among other sleep disorders. Awake In America was incorporated on July 15, 2004.

== Individuals ==
The organization works with individuals and family members to share information about proper sleep and sleep hygiene, as well as treating sleep issues, and overcoming challenges related to therapies for sleep disorders.

Awake In America also helps individuals, generally individuals who have been diagnosed with a sleep disorder, and at other times sleep labs and sleep specialists, to quickly and easily launch community education and support groups.

== Businesses ==
Awake In America also works with businesses to help accommodate employees with sleep-related issues. Without accommodation, many individuals would be fired for falling asleep in the workplace, or for what may be perceived by others as a lack of attention. With appropriate accommodations in place, employees get time for rest during the work day, but in exchange, work other times to make up for the rest breaks, which results in the employer keeping a valued employee and not having additional costs related to hiring and training a new employee, and possibly saving on unemployment benefits expenses.

== Programs ==
Awake In America operates two year-round relief programs, the Sleep Study Relief Program and the xPAP Donation and Relief Program, to assist American citizens who do not have health insurance, those who have inadequate health insurance (does not cover sleep studies and/or durable medical equipment), and those in financial straits.

In August 2005, Awake In America launched its premier direct-assist disaster relief program, Operation Restore CPAP, in response to Hurricane Katrina, and later expanded to cover victims from Hurricane Rita, and its devastation on the United States' Gulf Coast.

The program had been authorized by the Board to operate for 90 days, which allowed the program to operate from September 1, 2005, through December 3, 2005.

During the 90 days that Awake In America's Operation Restore CPAP program operated in response to Hurricane Katrina, and later Hurricane Rita, Awake In America shipped replacement equipment, with an estimated value of about $47,000, to 97 individuals who had relocated to nine states, without charge to the recipients. Awake In America is the only organization to have such a program in the United States.
