= Camp Restore =

Camp Restore is a Christian organization that operates a shelter for up to 240 people at the Prince of Peace Lutheran church in New Orleans East. First opened on September 10, 2006, these accommodations are used to house volunteers from across the United States as they help rebuild homes and buildings in the surrounding communities that had been destroyed by Hurricane Katrina. It also has locations in Baton Rouge and Detroit.

The Southern District of the Lutheran Church–Missouri Synod founded the organization with financial support coming from the LCMS Worldrelief/Humancare, Laborers for Christ and the Orphan Grain Train. Camp Restore's facilities include: a mobile food preparation unit—donated by Tyson Foods—for over 300 people, showers, air-conditioned living space, bunk style beds and RV support.

The housing serves as a base of operations for volunteers as they rebuild and restore the homes of people in the surrounding community. In 2006, over 300 homes had been assigned for these added to the restoration queue. A typical volunteer spends about a week at the camp and spends the vast majority of each day renovating homes and church buildings.

To date, the camp has served to accommodate over 3,500 volunteers who repaired the homes of over 200 families and the churches of three congregations. The organization also maintains a secondary goal of Christian ministry to those affected by the crisis and to improving the community through various projects.

Many of the volunteers consist of members of other churches who travel to New Orleans as part of a group missions trip. The volunteers are provided accommodation at the camp while they serve as the labor force that rebuilds the community.

In 2005, Hurricanes Katrina and Rita ravaged the Gulf Coast from Texas to Alabama. Over one million households were displaced and over 250,000 homes destroyed. People from all over gave millions of dollars, and millions of volunteers traveled to the Gulf Coast to help those in need. Volunteer camps and tent cities sprung up along the coast to house and equip volunteer crews for “mucking” and “gutting” houses. The gargantuan task of rebuilding followed.

In the days immediately after Hurricane Katrina, a relief team of talented people, a number of whom had been displaced by the storm, was assembled to plan the response of the Southern District Lutheran Church–Missouri Synod [LCMS]. Southern District President Kurtis Schultz asked Pastor David Lewis to serve as response coordinator. The Southern District Relief Team was established and the coordination of efforts and resources began to form with the purpose: “To bring hope, healing, and recovery to our workers, our churches and schools, our members and our neighbors.”

The efforts in the initial six months following the storm were immense. Assistance, encouragement and hands-on help were received from around the Lutheran Church–Missouri Synod and beyond. Thousands of volunteers came to serve and millions of dollars were contributed to relief efforts.

The scope of the effort was necessarily broad. This substantial response includes a huge volunteer-management effort, supplying salary support and counseling to affected church-workers, providing member-support activities, starting a community-development ministry, and giving ministry and facility grants to congregations.

Three volunteer camps were established in cooperation with Lutheran Disaster Response and the Southern District LCMS: Camp Biloxi at Good Shepherd Lutheran Church in Biloxi, Mississippi, Camp Atonement at Atonement Lutheran Church in Metairie, Louisiana, and Camp Hope at Lamb of God Lutheran Church in Slidell, Louisiana. In addition to these camps, many other Lutheran congregations in the affected area have hosted volunteers and been instrumental in the relief effort.

In the summer of 2006, plans were made to open Camp Restore in New Orleans on the once-flooded campus of Prince of Peace Lutheran Church and School. Laborers for Christ [LFC] (a ministry of Lutheran Church Extension Fund) began the process of renovating the campus and converting it into a volunteer construction camp.

In August 2006 Rev. David Buss was appointed director of the Disaster Relief Team, replacing Lewis, who resumed his calling to plant a church in Northern Mississippi.

Camp Restore was opened in October 2006 with Pastor Ed Brashier as camp director. Designed to accommodate up to 300 volunteers, Camp Restore is equipped with a large RV trailer park, indoor showers, air conditioning, and a portable restaurant kitchen custom-built on a semi trailer by Orphan Grain Train.

In September 2007, RAI Ministries assumed operation of the volunteer hospitality operations of Camp Biloxi and assumed full operation of the camp in April 2008.

RAI Ministries grew further with the 2007 Recovery Plan entitled “Spirit Kindle.” Subsidiary divisions were formed in order to achieve specific ministry initiatives. Those objectives were: further developing Christian outreach in time of disaster (REinstitute); networking churches for ministry and community development (LINCNewOrleans); and continuing to distribute resources to affected churches (Ministry Recovery).

In August 2008 the Southern District granted complete legal separation to RAI Ministries, which now operates as an independent 501(c)(3) not-for-profit organization. This was immediately followed by a figuratively and literally turbulent time as Hurricane Gustav hit the Louisiana coast while a major organizational restructuring was taking place.

RAI emerged from the fall of 2008 with a renewed focus on three functions: housing volunteers at Camp Biloxi and Camp Restore; equipping and empowering them to restore faith, home and community; and providing case management support to ensure that Katrina survivors’ needs were met as effectively as possible.

By 2010 RAI’s volunteer camps had hosted over 30,000 volunteers and managed construction efforts to complete over 6,000 projects (2,750+ major home repairs and 4,000+ minor home repairs and other projects). Additionally, three churches and one school facility were restored. Over 1,000 cases were managed through grant contracts in both Louisiana and Mississippi.

For the individual, the recovery process has had many obstacles: obstinate insurance companies, unscrupulous contractors, material shortages and endless government bureaucracy, just to name a few. Estimates place the recovery effort at taking a decade or longer. Thousands of homeowners continue the slow and often agonizing process of rebuilding. On top of the homes still needing repair, many community services and organizations dependent on volunteers remain hard-hit as well.

Mindful of the continuing need, RAI Ministries began a three-year transformation in 2008 from a short-term disaster-relief organization to an ongoing, sustainable ministry that continues to connect volunteers from around the nation with opportunities to help restore faith, home and community in the Name of Jesus.

As grant-based case management programs were brought to completion and Camp Biloxi was phased out, in 2010 organizational focus turned to continuing work through Camp Restore in New Orleans. Pastor David Goodine accepted the call to become the next executive director of RAI Ministries, and Buss transferred his leadership duties to Goodine in August 2010.

The 2010-2011 volunteer "season" was the busiest in Camp Restore’s history, with just shy of 4,000 volunteers coming to serve in New Orleans.

The site at Prince of Peace, New Orleans is also the location of New Orleans East Senior Center. It is operated with funding from the City of New Orleans and private donations.
