= Katrina PeopleFinder Project =

The Katrina PeopleFinder Project was set up in early September, 2005 in response to the dozens of groups collecting "lost and safe" lists for people affected by Hurricane Katrina. It provided a virtual messaging center using skype as well as creating "a uniform standard for collecting, compiling, data-entering", and "searching information on people affected by Hurricane Katrina".

The project was conceived on Friday, September 2 with the establishment of the KatrinaHelp Wiki. Volunteers manually entered 15,200 records in less than 24 hours and data entry was stopped with over 90,000 entries (when no new entries were apparent) by Tuesday, September 7. Dozens of technologists and thousands of volunteers had helped make it happen.

The Katrina PeopleFinder Project is an example of a nonprofit technology initiative implemented entirely by volunteers. Over 4000 people donated their time as data entry crew members.

== Motivation ==
As had happened in the aftermath of the September 11 attacks, a multitude of sites had been independently gathering lists of survivors or missing-persons requests. This project set up a system for entering data according to a standard format (PeopleFinder Interchange Format, also known as PFIF), and reached out to the other sites gathering this information to encourage them to use the same database and avoid duplicating effort.

== People Finder Interchange Format ==
The People Finder Interchange Format (PFIF) is an XML format used for exchanging information about individuals found or identified in the aftermath of a disaster. It was created quickly following the devastation of Hurricane Katrina as part of the Katrina PeopleFinder Project, in September, 2005. PFIF is an example of a nonprofit technology initiative implemented entirely by volunteers. Google Person Finder is based on PFIF.
