= Google Person Finder =

Open source registry and message board

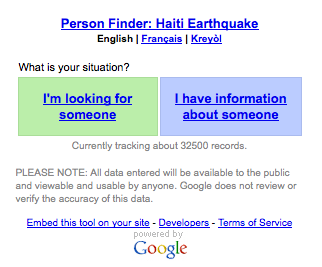
- Google Person Finder embeddable widget (January 19, 2010)
- Website type: Humanitarian aid
- Available in: Multilingual (47)
- Owner: Google, Inc.
- Revenue: none
- Website: google.org/personfinder
- Launched: January 15, 2010

Google Person Finder is an open source web application that provides a registry and message board for survivors, family, and loved ones affected by a natural disaster to post and search for information about each other's status and whereabouts. It was created by volunteer Google engineers in response to the 2010 Haiti earthquake.

Google Person Finder is written in Python and hosted on Google App Engine. Its database and API are based on the People Finder Interchange Format (PFIF) developed in 2005 for the Katrina PeopleFinder Project.

== History ==
Immediately after the 2010 Haiti earthquake a group of 20 volunteer engineers developed Person Finder. The software was based on Ka-Ping Yee's work on the September 11 survivor registry and on the PFIF data standard. Google also worked with the United States Department of State to create an embeddable version, which was embedded on the State Department's website and other websites. Google Person Finder launched in English, French, and Haitian Creole on January 15, less than three days after the earthquake.

As with previous response efforts to the September 11 attacks and Hurricane Katrina, many different organizations created sites with lists of missing persons, leading to a concern that information would be scattered across incompatible information silos. Using PFIF, Google Person Finder aggregated the data from many of these sites, including registries run by CNN, the Miami Herald, and The New York Times.

Google's work on the Haiti earthquake led to the formation of the Google Crisis Response team, which has launched Google Person Finder again for several subsequent disasters, in many different languages and with a variety of data exchange partners.

== Deployment ==
Google Person Finder is typically embedded in a multilingual Crisis Response page on Google's site, which also contains various other disaster tools such as satellite photographs, shelter locations, road conditions, and power outage information. For the 2011 Tōhoku earthquake and tsunami, Google also set up a Picasa account to allow people to submit photos of the name lists posted in emergency shelters, to be manually transcribed and entered into Google Person Finder.

Noteworthy deployments of Google Person Finder include:

- January 2010: 2010 Haiti earthquake (complete within 72 hours)
- February 2010: 2010 Chile earthquake (live within one day)
- July 2010: 2010 Pakistan floods (considered a failure because people in the affected area did not have Internet access)
- February 2011: February 2011 Christchurch earthquake (live within 3 hours)
- March 2011: 2011 Tōhoku earthquake and tsunami (live within 1 hour)
- October 2011: 2011 Van earthquake (live within 1 hour)
- April 2013: 2013 Boston Marathon bombing
- April 2013: 2013 Ya'an earthquake (live within one day)
- October 2013: 2013 Cyclone Phailin
- November 2013: Typhoon Haiyan (Yolanda)
- April 2015: April 2015 Nepal earthquake.

The system was tracking 202,400 names as of March 15, 2011 and more than 600,000 as of April 4, 2011.

== Details ==
Sites that adopt PFIF may interconnect with each other by exporting and transmitting data or allowing their site to be scraped; sites such as blogs and narrative accounts that are not compatible are reviewed by volunteers who key missing person information in PFIF format. The software widget used for directly entering information has two buttons, "I'm looking for someone" and "I have information about someone", and can be embedded directly onto other web pages.

== See also ==
- Facebook Safety Check
