= APCO radiotelephony spelling alphabet =

Old word list for law enforcement agencies

The APCO phonetic alphabet, a.k.a. LAPD radio alphabet, is the term for an old competing spelling alphabet to the ICAO radiotelephony alphabet, defined by the Association of Public-Safety Communications Officials-International from 1941 to 1974, that is used by the Los Angeles Police Department (LAPD) and other local and state law enforcement agencies across the state of California and elsewhere in the United States. It is the "over the air" communication used for properly understanding a broadcast of letters in the form of easily understood words. Despite often being called a "phonetic alphabet", it is not a phonetic alphabet for transcribing phonetics.

In 1974, APCO adopted the ICAO Radiotelephony Spelling Alphabet, making the APCO alphabet officially obsolete; however, it is still widely used, and relatively few police departments in the U.S. use the ICAO alphabet.

== Development ==
The APCO first suggested that its Procedure and Signals Committee work out a system for a "standard set of words representing the alphabet should be used by all stations" in its April 1940 newsletter. By this point, APCO President Herb Wareing "came out in favor of a standard list of words for alphabet letters, preferably suitable for both radiophone and radiotelegraph use."

The list was based on the results of questionnaires sent out by the Procedures Committee to all zone and interzone police radio stations. The questionnaire solicited suggestions, but also included the existing Western Union and Bell Telephone word lists, plus another list then in general use by a number of police stations. Lists used by military services were excluded because of a lack of permission to reproduce. The resulting final list differs from the Bell Telephone word list by only five words, and from the Western Union word list by only eight words.

== Replacement with international spelling alphabet ==
In 1974, APCO adopted the ICAO International Radiotelephony Spelling Alphabet, replacing the Adam-Boy-Charlie alphabet APCO first published in 1940. However, most police departments nationwide have kept using the 1940 APCO spelling alphabet, with those using the 1974 APCO spelling alphabet being the exception, rather than the rule. A partial list of police departments using the modern APCO/ICAO spelling alphabet includes:

- Saint Paul, Minnesota Police Department

== LAPD usage history ==
At some point in the early history of emergency service mobile radio systems, the LAPD adopted the APCO radio spelling alphabet for relaying precise information on individual letters. For example, the license plate "8QXG518" might be read by a civilian as "eight cue ex gee five eighteen" but with accuracy being paramount, the police dispatcher would say "eight queen x-ray george five one eight." Despite the development in 1941 of the Joint Army/Navy Phonetic Alphabet and its replacement, circa 1956, by the NATO phonetic alphabet (currently used by all NATO armed forces, civil aviation, amateur radio, telecommunications, and some law enforcement agencies), the LAPD and other law enforcement and emergency service agencies throughout the United States continue to use their traditional system.

APCO's Project 14 updated the definition of Ten-codes, and also adopted the international radiotelephony spelling alphabet for use by law enforcement nationwide.

== Comparison of U.S. law enforcement radiotelephony spelling alphabets ==
The APCO radiotelephony spelling alphabet and its variations represent the letters of the English alphabet using words as follows:

Law enforcement phonetic spelling alphabets
Letter	APCO Procedure Committee 1941	APCO Project 2 1967	LAPD code word	CHP code word	LVMPD code word	APCO Project 14 (1974)	Present ICAO code words
A	Adam	Adam	Adam	Adam	Adam	ALPHA	Alfa
B	Babe	Box	Boy	Boy	Back	BRAVO	Bravo
C	Charles	Charles	Charles	Charles	Charlie	CHARLIE	Charlie
D	David	David	David	David	David	DELTA	Delta
E	Edward	Edward	Edward	Edward	Easy	ECHO	Echo
F	Frank	Frank	Frank	Frank	Frank	FOXTROT	Foxtrot
G	George	George	George	George	George	GOLF	Golf
H	Henry	Henry	Henry	Henry	Henry	HOTEL	Hotel
I	Ida	Ida	Ida	Ida	Ida	INDIA	India
J	John	John	John	John	John	JULIETTE	Juliett
K	King	King	King	King	King	KILO	Kilo
L	Lincoln	Lincoln	Lincoln	Lincoln	Lincoln	LIMA	Lima
M	Mary	Mary	Mary	Mary	Mary	MIKE	Mike
N	Nora (North was the original proposal)	Nora	Nora	Nora	Nora	NOVEMBER	November
O	Ocean	Ocean	Ocean	Ocean	Ocean	OSCAR	Oscar
P	Poppy	Poppy	Paul	Paul	Poppy	PAPA	Papa
Q	Queen	Queen	Queen	Queen	Queen	QUEBEC	Quebec
R	Robert	Robert	Robert	Robert	Robert	ROMEO	Romeo
S	Sam	Sam	Sam	Sam	Sam	SIERRA	Sierra
T	Tom	Tom	Tom	Tom	Tom	TANGO	Tango
U	Union	Union	Union	Union	Union	UNIFORM	Uniform
V	Victor	Victor	Victor	Victor	Victor	VICTOR	Victor
W	William	William	William	William	William	WHISKEY	Whiskey
X	Xray	X-ray	X-ray	X-ray	X-ray	XRAY	X-ray
Y	Young	Young	Young	Yellow	Yellow	YANKEE	Yankee
Z	Zebra	Zebra	Zebra	Zebra	Zebra	ZULU	Zulu
0		ZERO (with a strong Z and a short RO)	Zero				Zero
1		WUN (with a strong W and N)	One				Wun
2		TOO (with a strong and long OO)	Two				Too
3		TH-R-EE (with a slightly rolling R and long EE)	Three				Tree
4		FO-WER (with a long O and strong W and final R	Four				Fower
5		VIE-YIV (with a long I changing to short and strong Y and V)	Five				Fife
6		SIKS (with a strong S and KS)	Six				Six
7		SEV-VEN (with a strong S and V and well-sounded VEN)	Seven				Seven
8		ATE (with a long A and strong T)	Eight				Eight
9		NI-YEN (with a strong N at the beginning, a long I and a well sounded YEN)	Niner				Niner
.							Decimal
00							Hundred
000							Thousand

There are several local variations of this system in use. The Metropolitan Police Department (Washington DC), uses the APCO alphabet, however the California Highway Patrol, Las Vegas Metropolitan Police Department, Los Angeles County Sheriff's Department, San Jose Police Department, San Francisco Police Department, and other agencies across the West Coast and Southwestern United States, use versions that allocate Yellow to "Y" and other agencies' versions allocate Baker or Bravo to "B", or use variations that include Nancy instead of Nora for "N", Easy instead of Edward for "E", or Yesterday for "Y".

With the ultimate goal of clarity, especially in circumstances where signals can be garbled, the use of the word Ocean seems to be advantageous in the radio communication of the letter "O" because it begins with the long, clear vowel "O". The phonetic words Ida and Union feature this same advantage. However, spelling alphabets seem to rarely use initial long vowels. With the exception of Uniform, none of the initial vowels in the NATO alphabet is like this. In an earlier U.S. military alphabet, "A" was indicated by Able, which does start with a long "A", but has since been changed to Alpha (also spelled Alfa, particularly outside the English-speaking countries). In like manner, for clarity, the use of "niner" instead of "nine" for the numeral 9 prevents confusion with the numeral 5, which can sound similar, especially when communications are garbled.

== Popular culture ==
The origin of the name Adam-12 from the television series of the same title comes from this alphabet. The LAPD still calls its basic two-man patrol car an "A" unit, and the letter "A" is spoken as "Adam" in the spelling alphabet. The entire callsign "1-Adam-12" translates to [Division] One (LAPD Central Division) Two Man Patrol Car (Adam unit) in patrol car 12. The 12 refers to what is called "The Basic Car Plan". That is, the patrol area within the precinct. Specialized units use the last numbers as designating the officers. An example would be 6U2, Hollywood Division report writing unit. The patrol car, in LAPD jargon, is called a "black-and-white", owing to the colors. The number that is on the car is called the shop number and is only used for identifying the vehicle.

In the American television series CHiPs from 1977 to 1983, motorcycle units are identified with the letter "M", such as 7M4 (Seven Mary Four) for Officer Frank Poncherello (portrayed by Erik Estrada). His partner, Officer Jon Baker (portrayed by actor Larry Wilcox), is identified as 7M3 (Seven Mary Three). In these callsigns, "7" designates the patrol beat, "M" designates a motorcycle unit, and "3" is the unit number.

Hunter from 1984 to 1991 had actor Fred Dryer as Rick Hunter identify as "1 William 1 Paul 156" as his call sign where W is "William" and P is "Paul" when he was with the LAPD.

Also, since many police, fire department, and rescue squad TV programs and movies are set in Los Angeles, the words of the LAPD phonetic alphabet have become familiar in the United States, Canada and English-speaking countries around the world due to the wide reach of American entertainment media. When used by workers such as telephone operators speaking to "civilians" who may be unfamiliar with the use of a phonetic alphabet, both the everyday letter and its phonetic alphabet equivalent are spoken, such as "B as in boy", "V as in Victor", etc.

On early seasons of Wheel of Fortune, a close variant of the LAPD phonetic alphabet was used. Players would be encouraged to say things like "I'll have B as in boy" when choosing letters.

== See also ==
- Spelling alphabet
- Allied Military Phonetic Spelling Alphabet
- ICAO/NATO phonetic alphabet - International Civil Aviation Organization (ICAO) phonetic alphabet, also used in the NATO
- Language-specific spelling alphabets
  - Greek spelling alphabet
  - German spelling alphabet
  - Dutch spelling alphabet
  - Russian spelling alphabet
- Cockney alphabet
