= Allied military phonetic spelling alphabets =

Word lists used in military radio communication

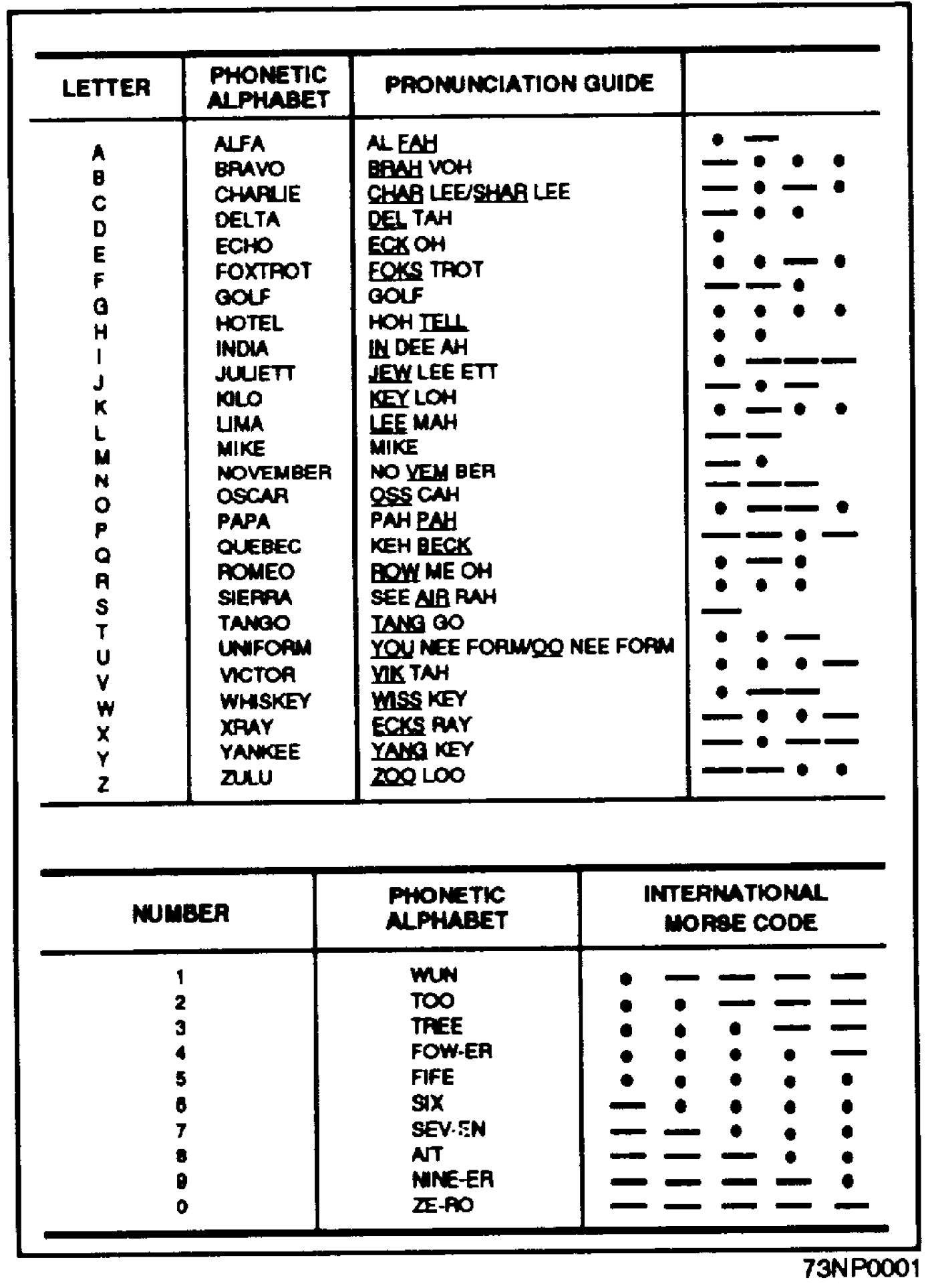
NATO Phonetic And Morse Code Alphabet, from the US Navy Signalman 3 & 2 training manual, 1996. This table combines the ICAO international spelling alphabet and the ITU International Morse Code.

The Allied military phonetic spelling alphabets prescribed the words that are used to represent each letter of the alphabet, when spelling other words out loud, letter-by-letter, and how the spelling words should be pronounced for use by the Allies of World War II. They are not a "phonetic alphabet" in the sense in which that term is used in phonetics, i.e. they are not a system for transcribing speech sounds.

The Allied militaries – primarily the US and the UK – had their own radiotelephone spelling alphabets which had origins back to World War I and had evolved separately in the different services in the two countries. For communication between the different countries and different services specific alphabets were mandated.

The last WWII spelling alphabet continued to be used through the Korean War, being replaced in 1956 as a result of both countries adopting the ICAO/ITU Radiotelephony Spelling Alphabet, with the NATO members calling their usage the "NATO Phonetic Alphabet".

During WWII, the Allies had defined terminology to describe the scope of communications procedures among different services and nations. A summary of the terms used was published in a post-WWII NATO memo:

- combined—between services of one nation and those of another nation, but not necessarily within or between the services of the individual nations
- joint—between (but not necessarily within) two or more services of one nation
- intra—within a service (but not between services) of one nation

Thus, the Combined Communications Board (CCB), created in 1941, derived a spelling alphabet that was mandated for use when any US military branch was communicating with any British military branch; when operating without any British forces, the Joint Army/Navy spelling alphabet was mandated for use whenever the US Army and US Navy were communicating in joint operations; if the US Army was operating on its own, it would use its own spelling alphabet, in which some of the letters were identical to the other spelling alphabets and some completely different.

== WWII CCB (ICAO) and NATO alphabets ==
NATO phonetic alphabet
voice recording: NATO phonetic alphabet

The US and UK began to coordinate calling alphabets by the military during World War II and by 1943 they had settled on a streamline communications that became known as the CCB. Both nations had previous independently developed alphabet naming system dating back to World War I. Subsequently, this second world war era letter naming became accepted as standard by the ICAO in 1947.

After the creation of NATO in 1949, modifications began to take place. An alternative name for the ICAO spelling alphabet, "NATO phonetic alphabet", exists because it appears in Allied Tactical Publication ATP-1, Volume II: Allied Maritime Signal and Maneuvering Book used by all navies of NATO, which adopted a modified form of the International Code of Signals. Because the latter allows messages to be spelled via flags or Morse code, it naturally named the code words used to spell out messages by voice its "phonetic alphabet". The name NATO phonetic alphabet became widespread because the signals used to facilitate the naval communications and tactics of NATO have become global. However, ATP-1 is marked NATO Confidential (or the lower NATO Restricted) so it is not available publicly. Nevertheless, a NATO unclassified version of the document is provided to foreign, even hostile, militaries, even though they are not allowed to make it available publicly. The spelling alphabet is now also defined in other unclassified international military documents. The NATO alphabet appeared in some United States Air Force Europe publications during the Cold War. A particular example was the Ramstein Air Base Telephone Directory, published between 1969 and 1973 (currently out of print). The US and NATO versions had differences, and the translation was provided as a convenience. Differences included Alfa, Bravo and Able, Baker for the first two letters.

The NATO phonetic spelling alphabet was first adopted on 1 January 1956, while the ICAO radiotelephony spelling alphabet was still undergoing final changes.

Wartime CCB and post-war NATO
Letter	1943 CCB (US-UK) (same as 1947 ICAO)	NATO	
Letter	1943 CCB (US-UK) (same as 1947 ICAO)	1 Jan – 29 Feb 1956	1 March 1956 – present
A	Able	Alfa	
B	Baker	Bravo	
C	Charlie		
D	Dog	Delta	
E	Easy	Echo	
F	Fox	Foxtrot	
G	George	Golf	
H	How	Hotel	
I	Item	India	
J	Jig	Juliett	
K	King	Kilo	
L	Love	Lima	
M	Mike		
N	Nan	Nectar	November
O	Oboe	Oscar	
P	Peter	Papa	
Q	Queen	Quebec	
R	Roger	Romeo	
S	Sugar	Sierra	
T	Tare	Tango	
U	Uncle	Uniform	
V	Victor		
W	William	Whiskey	
X	Xray	X-ray	
Y	Yoke	Yankee	
Z	Zebra	Zulu	
0	Zero		
1	Wun		
2	Too		
3	Thuh-ree		
4	Fo-wer		
5	Fi-yiv		
6	Six		
7	Seven		
8	Ate		
9	Niner		

== United Kingdom military spelling alphabets ==
=== British Army radiotelephony spelling alphabet ===
British Army radiotelephony spelling alphabet
Letter	1904	1904	1914	1914–1918	1918	1956–present
A	Ack	Ack	Ack	Apples	Ack	Alfa
B	Beer	Beer	Beer	Butter	Beer	Bravo
C	C	Cork	C	Charlie	Cork	Charlie
D	D	Don	Don	Duff	Don	Delta
E	E	Eddy	E	Edward	Eddy	Echo
F	F	Freddy	F	Freddie	Freddy	Foxtrot
G	G	George	G	George	George	Golf
H	H	Harry	H	Harry	Harry	Hotel
I	I	Ink	I	Ink	Ink	India
J	J	Jug	J	Johnnie	Jug	Juliett
K	K	King	K	King	King	Kilo
L	L	London	L	London	London	Lima
M	Emma	Emma	Emma	Monkey	Emma	Mike
N	N	Nuts	N	Nuts	Nuts	November
O	O	Orange	O	Orange	Orange	Oscar
P	Pip	Pip	Pip	Pudding	Pip	Papa
Q	Q	Quad	Q	Queenie	Quad	Quebec
R	R	Robert	R	Robert	Robert	Romeo
S	Esses	Esses	Esses	Sugar	Esses	Sierra
T	Toc	Toc	Toc	Tommy	Toc	Tango
U	U	Uncle	U	Uncle	Uncle	Uniform
V	Vic	Vic	Vic	Vinegar	Vic	Victor
W	W	William	W	William	William	Whisky
X	X	Xerxes	X	X-Ray	Xerxes	X-ray
Y	Y	Yellow	Y	Yorker	Yellow	Yankee
Z	Z	Zebra	Z	Zebra	Zebra	Zulu

=== Royal Navy radiotelephony spelling alphabet ===
Royal Navy radiotelephony spelling alphabet
Letter	1914–1918	1921	1956–present
A	Apples	Ac	Alfa
B	Butter	Beer	Bravo
C	Charlie	Charlie	Charlie
D	Duff	Don	Delta
E	Edward	Edward	Echo
F	Freddy	Fox	Foxtrot
G	George	George	Golf
H	Harry	How	Hotel
I	Ink	Ink	India
J	Johnnie	Johnnie	Juliett
K	King	King	Kilo
L	London	Love	Lima
M	Monkey	Monkey	Mike
N	Nuts	Nan	November
O	Orange	Orange	Oscar
P	Pudding	Pip	Papa
Q	Queenie	Queen	Quebec
R	Robert	Robert	Romeo
S	Sugar	Sugar	Sierra
T	Tommy	Toc	Tango
U	Uncle	Uncle	Uniform
V	Vinegar	Vic	Victor
W	William	William	Whisky
X	Xerxes	X-ray	X-ray
Y	Yellow	Yoke	Yankee
Z	Zebra	Zebra	Zulu

=== RAF radiotelephony spelling alphabet ===
The RAF radiotelephony spelling alphabet, sometimes referred to as the "RAF Phonetic Alphabet", was used by the British Royal Air Force (RAF) to aid communication after the take-up of radio, especially to spell out aircraft identification letters, e.g. "H for Harry", "G for George", etc. Several alphabets were used, before being superseded by the adoption of the NATO/ICAO radiotelephony alphabet.

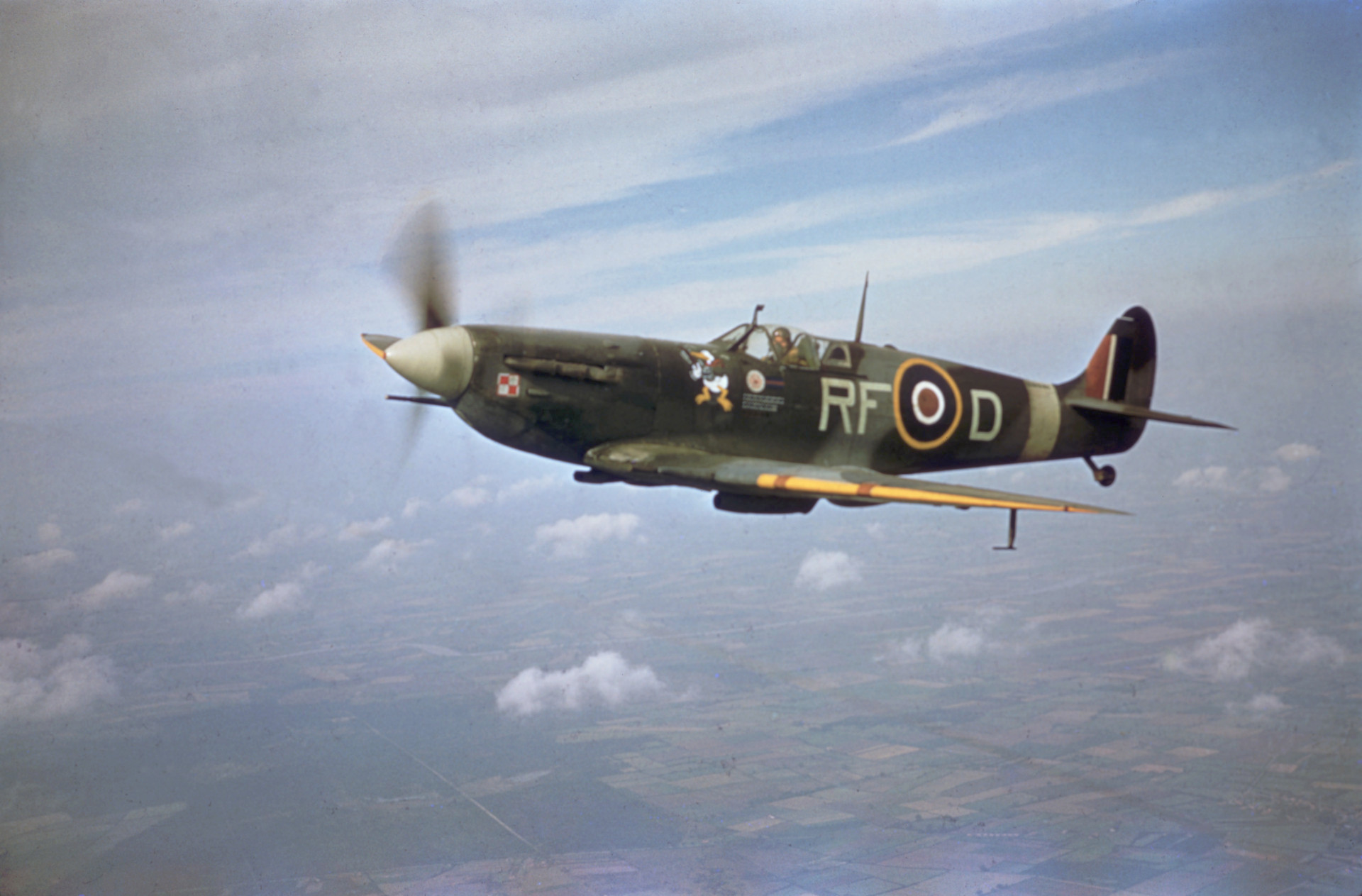
Supermarine Spitfire Mk Vb of the Polish 303 Kościuszko Squadron showing the RAF squadron code "RF" of 303 Squadron and the individual aircraft letter "D" which would be spoken, D-Dog

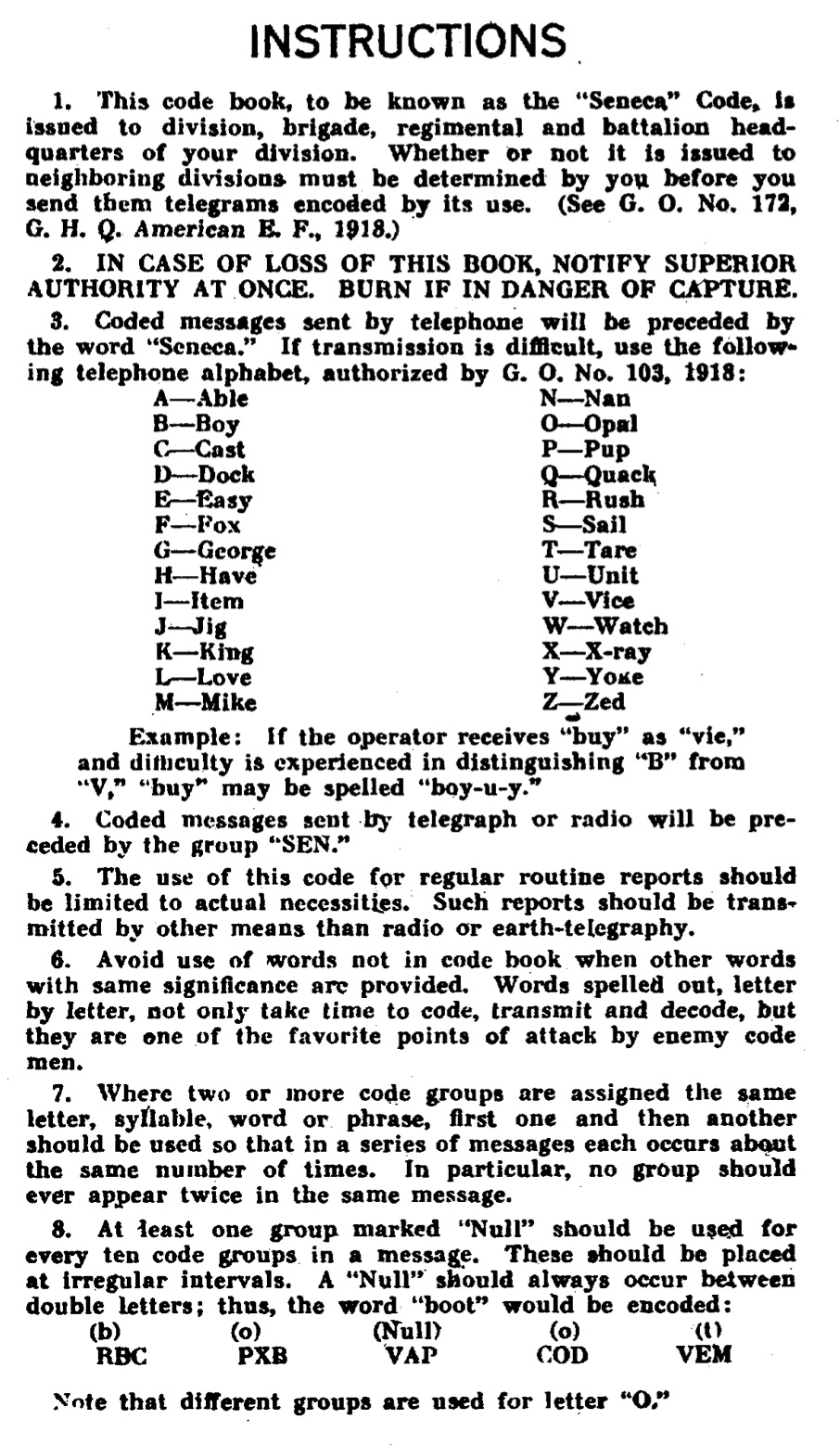
Instruction page from WW I U.S. Army trench code, Seneca edition, with spelling alphabet for telephone and radio use

==== History ====
During World War I battle lines were often static and forces were commonly linked by wired telephone networks. Signals were weak on long wire runs and field telephone systems often used a single wire with earth return, which made them subject to inadvertent and deliberate interference. Spelling alphabets were introduced for wire telephony as well as on the newer radio voice equipment.

The British Army and the Royal Navy had developed their own quite separate spelling alphabets. The Navy system was a full alphabet, starting: Apples, Butter, Charlie, Duff, Edward, but the RAF alphabet was based on that of the "signalese" of the army signallers. This was not a full alphabet, but differentiated only the letters most frequently misunderstood: Ack (originally "Ak"), Beer (or Bar), C, D, E, F, G, H, I, J, K, L, eMma, N, O, Pip, Q, R, eSses, Toc, U, Vic, W, X, Y, Z.

By 1921, the RAF "Telephony Spelling Alphabet" had been adopted by all three armed services, and was then made mandatory for UK civil aviation, as announced in Notice to Airmen Number 107.

In 1956, the NATO phonetic alphabet was adopted due to the RAF's wide commitments with NATO and worldwide sharing of civil aviation facilities.

RAF radiotelephony spelling alphabet
Letter	1921–1942	1942–1955	1956–present
A	Apple	Able/Affirm	Alfa
B	Beer	Baker	Bravo
C	Charlie	Charlie	Charlie
D	Don	Dog	Delta
E	Edward	Easy	Echo
F	Freddie	Fox	Foxtrot
G	George	George	Golf
H	Harry	How	Hotel
I	Ink	Item/Interrogatory	India
J	Jug/Johnnie	Jig/Johnny	Juliett
K	King	King	Kilo
L	London	Love	Lima
M	Monkey	Mike	Mike
N	Nuts^{[a]}	Nan/Nab/Negat/Nectar	November
O	Orange	Oboe	Oscar
P	Pip	Peter/Prep	Papa
Q	Queen	Queen	Quebec
R	Robert	Roger	Romeo
S	Sugar	Sugar	Sierra
T	Toc	Tare	Tango
U	Uncle	Uncle	Uniform
V	Vic^{[b]}	Victor	Victor
W	William	William	Whiskey
X	X-ray	X-ray	X-ray
Y	Yorker	Yoke	Yankee
Z	Zebra	Zebra	Zulu

^{a} The choice of Nuts following Monkey is probably from "monkey nuts" (peanuts); likewise Orange and Pip can be similarly paired, as in "orange pip".
^{b} "Vic" subsequently entered the English language as the standard "Vee"-shaped flight pattern of three aircraft.

== United States military spelling alphabets ==
=== US Army radiotelephony spelling alphabet ===
US Army radiotelephony spelling alphabet
Letter	1916 Signal Book 1916–1939	FM 24-5 1939–1941	FM 24-5 1941–1943	FM 24-12 1943–1955	ICAO 1956–present
A	Able	Afirm	Afirm	Able	Alfa
B	Boy	Baker	Baker	Baker	Bravo
C	Cast	Cast	Cast	Charlie	Charlie
D	Dock	Dog	Dog	Dog	Delta
E	Easy	Easy	Easy	Easy	Echo
F	Fox	Fox	Fox	Fox	Foxtrot
G	George	George	George	George	Golf
H	Have	Hypo	Hypo	How	Hotel
I	Item	Inter	Inter^{†}	Item	India
J	Jig	Jig	Jig	Jig	Juliett
K	King	King	King	King	Kilo
L	Love	Love	Love	Love	Lima
M	Mike	Mike	Mike	Mike	Mike
N	Nan	Negat	Negat	Nan	November
O	Opal	Option	Option	Oboe	Oscar
P	Pup	Prep	Prep	Peter	Papa
Q	Quack	Queen	Queen	Queen	Quebec
R	Rush	Roger	Roger	Roger	Romeo
S	Sail	Sail	Sail	Sugar	Sierra
T	Tare	Tare	Tare	Tare	Tango
U	Unit	Unit	Unit	Uncle	Uniform
V	Vice	Victor	Victor	Victor	Victor
W	Watch	William	William	William	Whiskey
X	X-ray	Xray	Xray	Xray	X-ray
Y	Yoke	Yoke	Yoke	Yoke	Yankee
Z	Zed	Zed	Zed	Zebra	Zulu
0		Zero	Zero	Zero	Zero
1		Wun	Wun	Wun	Wun
2		Too	Too	Too	Too
3		Th-r-ee	Th-r-ee	Thuh-ree	Tree
4		Fo-wer	Fo-wer	Fo-wer	Fow-er
5		Fi-iv	Fi-yiv	Fi-yiv	Fife
6		Siks	Siks	Six	Siks
7		Sev-ven	Sev-ven	Seven	Seven
8		Ate	Ate	Ate	Ate
9		Ni-yen	Ni-yen	Niner	Niner

^{†} 'Interrogatory' was used in place of 'Inter' in joint Army/Navy Operations.

=== US Navy radiotelephony spelling alphabet ===
The US Navy's first phonetic spelling alphabet was not used for radio, but was instead used on the deck of ships "in calling out flags to be hoisted in a signal". There were two alternative alphabets used, which were almost completely different from each other, with only the code word "Xray" in common.

The US Navy's first radiotelephony phonetic spelling alphabet was published in 1913, in the Naval Radio Service's Handbook of Regulations developed by Captain William H. G. Bullard. The Handbook's procedures were described in the November 1917 edition of Popular Science Monthly.

US Navy phonetic alphabets 1913 to present
Letter	1908		1913–1926	1927–1937	1938	WWII	ICAO 1956–present
A	Actor	Ash	Able	Afirm	Afirm	AFIRM	Alfa
B	Baker	Back	Boy	Baker	Baker	BAKER	Bravo
C	Canteen	Chain	Cast	Cast	Cast	CHARLIE	Charlie
D	Diver	Dog	Dog	Dog	Dog	DOG	Delta
E	Eagle	Egg	Easy	Easy	Easy	EASY	Echo
F	Fisher	Fox	Fox	Fox	Fox	FOX	Foxtrot
G	Gangway	Gig	George	George	George	GEORGE	Golf
H	Halliard	Horse	Have	Hypo	Hypo	HOW	Hotel
I	Insect	Ice	Item	Int	Int	INT	India
J	Jockey	Jake	Jig	Jig	Jig	JIG	Juliett
K	Knapsack	King	King	King	King	KING	Kilo
L	Lugger	Lash	Love	Love	Love	LOVE	Lima
M	Musket	Mule	Mike	Mike	Mike	MIKE	Mike
N	Neptune	Net	Nan	Negat	Negat	NEGAT	November
O	Oyster	Oak	Oboe	Option	Option	OPTION	Oscar
P	Pistol	Page	Pup	Prep	Prep	PREP	Papa
Q	Quadrant	Quail	Quack	Quack	Queen	QUEEN	Quebec
R	Reefer	Raft	Rush	Roger	Roger	ROGER	Romeo
S	Shipmate	Scout	Sail	Sail	Sail	SUGAR	Sierra
T	Topsail	Tide	Tare	Tare	Tare	TARE	Tango
U	Unload	Use	Unit	Unit	Unit	UNCLE	Uniform
V	Vessel	Vast	Vice	Vice	Victor	VICTOR	Victor
W	Windage	Winch	Watch	William	William	WILLIAM	Whiskey
X	Xray	Xray	X-ray	X-ray	X-ray	XRAY	X-ray
Y	Yeoman	Yacht	Yoke	Yoke	Yoke	YOKE	Yankee
Z	Zebra	Zoo	Zed	Zed	Zed	ZEBRA	Zulu

=== Joint Army/Navy radiotelephony spelling alphabet ===
The Joint Army/Navy (JAN) spelling alphabet was developed by the Joint Board on 13 November 1940, and it took effect on 1 March 1941. It was reformulated by the CCB following the entrance of the US into World War II by the CCB "Methods and Procedures" committee, and was used by all branches of the United States Armed Forces until the promulgation of its replacement, the ICAO spelling alphabet (Alfa, Bravo, etc.), in 1956. Before the JAN phonetic alphabet, each branch of the armed forces had used its own radio alphabet, leading to difficulties in interbranch communication.

The US Army used this alphabet in modified form, along with the British Army and Canadian Army from 1943 onward, with "Sugar" replacing "Sail".

The JAN spelling alphabet was used to name Atlantic basin storms during hurricane season from 1947 to 1952, before being replaced with a new system of using female names.

Vestiges of the JAN spelling system remain in use in the US Navy, in the form of Material Conditions of Readiness, used in damage control. Dog, William, X-Ray, Yoke, and Zebra all reference designations of fittings, hatches, or doors. The response "Roger" for "· – ·" or "R", to mean "received", also derives from this alphabet.

The names Able to Fox were also widely used in the early days of hexadecimal digital encoding of text, for speaking the hexadecimal digits A to F (equivalent to decimal 10 to 15), although the written form was simply the capital letters A to F.

Joint US Army/Navy radiotelephony spelling alphabet
Letter	Joint Army/Navy 1941–1943	CCB 1943–1955	ICAO 1956–present
A	Able	ABLE	Alfa
B	Baker	BAKER	Bravo
C	Charlie	CHARLIE	Charlie
D	Dog	DOG	Delta
E	Easy	EASY	Echo
F	Fox	FOX	Foxtrot
G	George	GEORGE	Golf
H	How	HOW	Hotel
I	Item (or Interrogatory)	ITEM	India
J	Jig	JIG	Juliett
K	King	KING	Kilo
L	Love	LOVE	Lima
M	Mike	MIKE	Mike
N	Nan	NAN	November
O	Oboe	OBOE	Oscar
P	Peter	PETER	Papa
Q	Queen	QUEEN	Quebec
R	Roger	ROGER	Romeo
S	Sail/Sugar	SUGAR	Sierra
T	Tare	TARE	Tango
U	Uncle	UNCLE	Uniform
V	Victor	VICTOR	Victor
W	William	WILLIAM	Whisky
X	X-ray	XRAY	X-ray
Y	Yoke	YOKE	Yankee
Z	Zebra	ZEBRA	Zulu
0	Zero	Zero	Zero
1	One	Wun	Wun
2	Two	Too	Too
3	Three	Thuh-ree	Tree
4	Four	Fo-wer	Fower
5	Five	Fi-yiv	Fife
6	Six	Six	Siks
7	Seven	Seven	Seven
8	Eight	Ate	Ate
9	Nine	Niner	Niner

== See also ==
- Allied Communication Procedures
- International Code of Signals
- Spelling alphabet
  - APCO radiotelephony spelling alphabet
  - Cockney alphabet
  - German phonetic alphabet
  - Greek spelling alphabet
  - ICAO radiotelephony spelling alphabet
- Toc H—example of signalese carry-over
