= NATO phonetic alphabet =

Spoken alphabet for radio communication

Letter names
Alfa	November
Bravo	Oscar
Charlie	Papa
Delta	Quebec
Echo	Romeo
Foxtrot	Sierra
Golf	Tango
Hotel	Uniform
India	Victor
Juliett	Whiskey
Kilo	Xray
Lima	Yankee
Mike	Zulu
One	Six
Two	Seven
Three ('tree')	Eight
Four ('fower')	Nine ('niner')
Five ('fife')	Zero
ICAO spelling alphabet voice recording: ICAO spelling alphabet

The NATO phonetic alphabet, officially the International Radiotelephony Spelling Alphabet, is an internationally recognized set of names for the letters of the Latin alphabet and the Arabic digits. It is most commonly used in radio communication, where the usual names of the letters are likely to be misheard. It was defined in 1955–1956 by the International Civil Aviation Organization (ICAO).

== Usage ==
"Spelling alphabets" are used to distinguish letters when spelling out words. The alphabet is designed to minimize potential confusion, as radio and telephonic communication can be subject to static or other interference. For example, the message "proceed to map grid DH98" would be read out as "proceed to map grid Delta-Hotel-Niner-Eight".

Although such codes are commonly called "phonetic alphabets", they are not phonetic in the sense of phonetic transcription systems such as the International Phonetic Alphabet, nor are they alphabets used to write out messages, but rather clearer names for the letters of an alphabet.

Civilian industry uses the code words to avoid similar problems in the transmission of messages by telephone systems. For example, it is often used in the retail industry, where customer or site details are conveyed by telephone (e.g., to authorize a credit agreement or confirm stock codes), though ad hoc code words are often used in that instance. It has been used by information technology workers to communicate, by voice, very long serial numbers and reference codes. Most major airlines use the alphabet to communicate passenger name records (PNRs) internally, and in some cases, with customers. It is often used in a medical context as well.

The 26 code words are as follows (ICAO spellings): Alfa, Bravo, Charlie, Delta, Echo, Foxtrot, Golf, Hotel, India, Juliett, Kilo, Lima, Mike, November, Oscar, Papa, Quebec, Romeo, Sierra, Tango, Uniform, Victor, Whiskey, Xray, Yankee, and Zulu. (Note: In print, these code words are commonly capitalized or written in all caps for visual salience (CCEB 2016).) ⟨Alfa⟩ and ⟨Juliett⟩ are spelled that way to avoid mispronunciation by people unfamiliar with English orthography; NATO changed ⟨X-ray⟩ to ⟨Xray⟩ for the same reason. The code words for digits are their English names, though with their pronunciations modified in the cases of three, four, five, nine, and thousand.

Several codes words and sequences of code words have become well-known, such as Bravo Zulu (letter code BZ) for "well done", Checkpoint Charlie (Checkpoint C) in Berlin, and Zulu Time for Greenwich Mean Time or Coordinated Universal Time. During the Vietnam War, the US government referred to the Viet Cong guerrillas and the group itself as VC, or Victor Charlie; the name "Charlie" became synonymous with this force.

== Pronunciation of code words ==
=== Design ===
To create the code, a series of international agencies assigned 26 clear-code words (also known as "phonetic words") acrophonically to the letters of the Latin alphabet, with the goal that the letters and numbers would be easily distinguishable from one another over radio and telephone. The words were chosen to be accessible to speakers of English, French and Spanish. Some of the code words were changed over time, as they were found to be ineffective in real-life conditions.

The final choice of code words for the letters of the alphabet and for the digits was made after hundreds of thousands of comprehension tests involving 31 nationalities. The qualifying feature was the likelihood of a code word being understood in the context of others. For example, Football has a higher chance of being understood than Foxtrot in isolation, but Foxtrot is more often understood when combined with other words in the spelling alphabet.

Pronunciations were set out by the ICAO before 1956 with advice from the governments of both the United States and United Kingdom. To eliminate national variations in pronunciation, posters illustrating the pronunciation desired by ICAO are available. However, there remain differences in the pronunciations published by ICAO and other agencies, and ICAO has apparently conflicting Latin-alphabet and IPA transcriptions. At least some of these differences appear to be typographic errors. In 2022, the Deutsches Institut für Normung (DIN) attempted to resolve these conflicts. For example, they consistently transcribe [a] for what the ICAO had transcribed variously as [a], [aː], [ɑ], [ɑː], [æ], [ə] in IPA and as a, ah, ar, er in orthography.

In the official version of the alphabet, two spellings deviate from the English norm: Alfa and Juliett. Alfa is spelled with an f as it is in most European languages because the spelling Alpha may not be pronounced properly by native speakers of some languages – who may not know that ph should be pronounced as f. The spelling Juliett is used rather than Juliet for the benefit of French speakers, because they may otherwise treat a single final t as silent. For similar reasons, Charlie and Uniform have recognized alternative pronunciations where the ch is pronounced "sh" and the u is pronounced "oo", though these are not present on the NATO chart. Early on, the NATO alliance changed X-ray to Xray in its version of the alphabet to ensure that it would be pronounced as one word rather than as two, while the global organization ICAO keeps the spelling X-ray.

=== Numerical digits ===
Just as words are spelled out as individual letters, numbers are spelled out as individual digits. That is, 17 is rendered as one seven and 60 as six zero. Depending on context, the word thousand may be used as in English, and, for whole hundreds only (when the sequence 00 occurs at the end of a number), the word hundred may be used. For example, 1300 is read as one three zero zero if it is a transponder code or serial number, and as one thousand three hundred if it is an altitude or distance.

The ICAO, NATO, and FAA use modifications of English digits as code words, with 3, 4, 5 and 9 being pronounced tree, fower (rhymes with lower), fife and niner. The digit 3 is specified as tree so that it will not be mispronounced sri (and similarly thousand is pronounced tousand); the long pronunciation of 4 (still found in some English dialects) keeps it somewhat distinct from for; 5 is pronounced with a second "f" because the normal pronunciation with a "v" is easily confused with "fire"; and 9 has an extra syllable to keep it distinct from the German word nein "no". (Prior to 1956, three and five had been pronounced with the English consonants, but with the vowels broken into two syllables.) For directions presented as the hour-hand position on a clock, the additional numerals "ten", "eleven" and "twelve" are used with the word "o'clock".

The ITU and IMO, however, specify a different set of code words for digits. During 1947, the ITU adopted the compound Latinate prefix-number words (Nadazero, Unaone, etc.), later adopted by the IMO during 1965.

- Nadazero – from Spanish or Portuguese nada + NATO/ICAO zero
- Unaone – generic Romance una, from Latin ūna + NATO/ICAO one
- Bissotwo – from Latin bis + NATO/ICAO two. (1959 ITU proposals bis and too)
- Terrathree – from Italian terzo + NATO/ICAO three ("tree") (1959 ITU proposals ter and tree)
- Kartefour – from French quatre (Latin quartus) + NATO/ICAO four ("fow-er") (1959 ITU proposals quarto and fow-er)
- Pantafive – from Greek penta- + NATO/ICAO five ("fife") (from 1959 ITU proposals penta and fife)
- Soxisix – from French soix + NATO/ICAO six (1959 ITU proposals were saxo and six)
- Setteseven – from Italian sette + NATO/ICAO seven (1959 ITU proposals sette and sev-en)
- Oktoeight – generic Romance octo-, from Latin octō + NATO/ICAO eight (1959 ITU proposals octo and ait)
- Novenine – from Italian nove + NATO/ICAO nine ("niner") (1959 ITU proposals were nona and niner)

The IMO's GMDSS procedures permits the use of either set of code words.

=== Variants ===
Since "Nectar" was changed to "November" in 1956, the code has been mostly stable. However, there is occasional regional substitution of a few code words, such as replacing them with earlier variants, to avoid confusion with local terminology.

- As of 2013, it was reported that "Delta" was often replaced by "David" or "Dixie" at Atlanta International Airport, where Delta Air Lines is based, because "Delta" is also the airline's callsign. Air traffic control once referred to Taxiway D at the same airport as "Taxiway Dixie", though this practice was officially discontinued in 2020.
- "Foxtrot" may be shortened to "Fox" at airports in the United States.
- British police use "Indigo" rather than "India".
- In Indonesia, "London" is used in place of "Lima", because lima is the Malay word for 'five'.
- "Hawk" is sometimes used for "Hotel" in the Philippines. For example, in the Philippine Military Academy, the cadet company designated with the letter H is referred to as the "Hawk Company".

=== Tables ===
There are two IPA transcriptions of the letter names, from the International Civil Aviation Organization (ICAO) and the Deutsches Institut für Normung (DIN). Both authorities indicate that a non-rhotic pronunciation is standard. (Note: This is reinforced by the IMO, which for example has "TCHAH-LI" as the French respelling of Charlie and "OSS-CAH", "VIK-TAH" as the English respellings of Oscar and Victor.) That of the ICAO, first published in 1950 and reprinted many times without correction (e.g. the error in 'golf'), uses a large number of vowels. For instance, it has six low/central vowels: [æ], [a], [aː], [ɑ], [ɑː] and [ə]. The DIN consolidates all six into the single low-central vowel [a]. The DIN vowels are partly predictable, with the more open vowels [ɪ ɛ ɔ] in closed syllables and the more close vowels [i e/ei̯ o] in open syllables, apart from echo and sierra, which have [ɛ] as in English, German and Italian. The DIN also reduced the number of stressed syllables in bravo and x-ray, consistent with the ICAO English respellings of those words and with the NATO change of spelling of x-ray to xray so that people would know to pronounce it as a single word.

Letter code words with pronunciation
Symbol	Code word	DIN 5009 (2022) IPA	ICAO (1950)	
Symbol	Code word	DIN 5009 (2022) IPA	IPA	English respelling (Note: Capital letters, if any, indicate a stressed syllable.)
A	Alfa [sic]	ˈalfa	ˈælfa	AL fah
B	Bravo	ˈbravo	ˈbraːˈvo [sic]	BRAH voh
C	Charlie	ˈtʃali (or ˈʃali)	ˈtʃɑːli (or ˈʃɑːli)	CHAR lee (or SHAR lee)
D	Delta	ˈdɛlta	ˈdeltɑ	DELL tah
E	Echo	ˈɛko	ˈeko	ECK oh
F	Foxtrot	ˈfɔkstrɔt	ˈfɔkstrɔt	FOKS trot
G	Golf	ˈɡɔlf	ɡʌlf [sic]	golf
H	Hotel	hoˈtɛl	hoːˈtel	ho TELL
I	India	ˈɪndia	ˈindi.ɑ	IN dee ah
J	Juliett [sic]	ˈdʒuliˈɛt	ˈdʒuːli.ˈet	JEW lee ETT
K	Kilo	ˈkilo	ˈkiːlo	KEY loh
L	Lima	ˈlima	ˈliːmɑ	LEE mah
M	Mike	ˈmai̯k	mɑik	mike
N	November	noˈvɛmba	noˈvembə	no VEM ber
O	Oscar	ˈɔska	ˈɔskɑ	OSS cah
P	Papa	paˈpa	pəˈpɑ	pah PAH
Q	Quebec	keˈbɛk [sic]	keˈbek	keh BECK
R	Romeo	ˈromio	ˈroːmi.o	ROW me oh
S	Sierra	siˈɛra	siˈerɑ	see AIR rah
T	Tango	ˈtaŋɡo	ˈtænɡo	TANG go
U	Uniform	ˈjunifɔm (or ˈunifɔm)	ˈjuːnifɔːm (or ˈuːnifɔrm [sic])	YOU nee form (or OO nee form)
V	Victor	ˈvɪkta	ˈviktɑ	VIK tah
W	Whiskey	ˈwɪski	ˈwiski	WISS key
X	Xray, x-ray	ˈɛksrei̯	ˈeksˈrei [sic]	ECKS ray
Y	Yankee	ˈjaŋki	ˈjænki	YANG key
Z	Zulu	ˈzulu	ˈzuːluː	ZOO loo

There is no authoritative IPA transcription of the digits. However, there are respellings into both English and French, which can be compared to clarify some of the ambiguities and inconsistencies.

Digit code words with pronunciation
Symbol	Code word	Respellings							
Symbol	Code word	ICAO (English)	SIA (French)	CCEB 2016	FAA	ITU -R 2007 (WRC-07) IMO (English)	IMO (French)	US Navy 1957	US Army
1	One, unaone	WUN	OUANN	wun	wun	OO-NAH-WUN	OUNA-OUANN	wun	wun, won (USMC)
2	Two, bissotwo	TOO	TOU	too	too	BEES-SOH-TOO	BIS-SO-TOU	too	too
3	Three, terrathree	TREE	TRI	tree	tree	TAY-RAH-TREE	TÉ-RA-TRI	thuh-ree	tree
4	Four, kartefour	FOW-er	FO eur	FOW-er	fow-er	KAR-TAY-FOWER	KAR-TÉ-FO-EUR	fo-wer	fow-er
5	Five, pantafive	FIFE	FA ÏF [sic]	fife	fife	PAN-TAH-FIVE	PANN-TA-FAIF	fi-yiv	fife
6	Six, soxisix	SIX	SIKS	six	six	SOK-SEE-SIX	SO-XI-SICKS	six	six
7	Seven, setteseven	SEV-en	SÈV n	SEV-en	sev-en	SAY-TAY-SEVEN	SÉT-TÉ-SEV'N [sic]	seven	sev-en
8	Eight, oktoeight	AIT	EÏT	ait	ait	OK-TOH-AIT	OK-TO-EIT	ate	ait
9	Nine, novenine (Note: Written "nine" in the examples, but pronunciation given as "niner")	NIN-er	NAÏ neu	NINE-er	nin-er	NO-VAY-NINER	NO-VÉ-NAI-NEU	niner	nin-er
0	Zero, nadazero	ZE-RO (ZEE-ro) (Note: The ICAO specifies that all syllables in these words are to be equally stressed (§5.2.1.4.3 note), but in practice they are not. The IMO specifies that ZEE-ro and TOU-sand are stressed on their first syllable.)	ZI RO	ZE-ro	ze-ro / zee-ro	NAH-DAH-ZAY-ROH (Note: With the code words for the digits and decimal, each syllable is stressed equally.) (Note: Only the second (English) component of each code word is used by the Aeronautical Mobile Service.)	NA-DA-ZE-RO	zero	ze-ro
00	Hundred	HUN-dred	HUN-dred	(zero zero)	(hundred)			hun-dred	
000	Thousand	TOU-SAND (TOU-sand)	TAOU ZEND	(zero zero zero)	(thousand)			thow-zand	tou-sand
(decimal point)	Decimal, (FAA) point	DAY-SEE-MAL	DÈ SI MAL	(decimal)	(point)	DAY-SEE-MAL	DÉ-SI-MAL		

The Combined Communications-Electronics Board (CCEB) has code words for punctuation, including those in the table below.

Punctuation code words (CCEB)
Symbol	Code word
.	stop (when not a decimal point)
,	comma (when not a decimal comma)
-	hyphen, (FAA) dash
/	slant
(	brackets on
)	brackets off

Others are: "colon", "semi-colon", "exclamation mark", "question mark", "apostrophe", "quote", and "unquote".

== History ==
=== Before World War II ===
Prior to World War I and the development and widespread adoption of two-way radio that supported voice, telephone spelling alphabets were developed to improve communication on low-quality and long-distance telephone circuits.

The first non-military internationally recognized spelling alphabet was adopted by the CCIR (predecessor of the ITU) during 1927. The experience gained with that alphabet resulted in several changes being made during 1932 by the ITU. The resulting alphabet was adopted by the International Commission for Air Navigation, the predecessor of the ICAO, and was used for civil aviation until World War II. It continued to be used by the IMO until 1965.

=== During World War II ===
Throughout World War II, many nations used their own versions of a spelling alphabet. The US adopted the Joint Army/Navy radiotelephony alphabet during 1941 to standardize systems among all branches of its armed forces. The US alphabet became known as Able Baker after the words for A and B. The Royal Air Force adopted one similar to the United States one during World War II as well. Other British forces adopted the RAF radio alphabet, which is similar to the phonetic alphabet used by the Royal Navy during World War I. At least two of the terms are sometimes still used by UK civilians to spell words over the phone, namely F for Freddie and S for Sugar.

To enable the US, UK, and Australian armed forces to communicate during joint operations, in 1943 the CCB (Combined Communications Board; the combination of US and UK upper military commands) modified the US military's Joint Army/Navy alphabet for use by all three nations, with the result being called the US-UK spelling alphabet. It was defined in one or more of CCBP-1: Combined Amphibious Communications Instructions, CCBP3: Combined Radiotelephone (R/T) Procedure, and CCBP-7: Combined Communication Instructions. The CCB alphabet itself was based on the US Joint Army/Navy spelling alphabet. The CCBP (Combined Communications Board Publications) documents contain material formerly published in US Army Field Manuals in the 24-series. Several of these documents had revisions, and were renamed. For instance, CCBP3-2 was the second edition of CCBP3.

During World War II, the US military conducted significant research into spelling alphabets. Major F. D. Handy, directorate of Communications in the Army Air Force (and a member of the working committee of the Combined Communications Board), enlisted the help of Harvard University's Psycho-Acoustic Laboratory, asking them to determine the most successful word for each letter when using "military interphones in the intense noise encountered in modern warfare." He included lists from the US, Royal Air Force, Royal Navy, British Army, AT&T, Western Union, RCA Communications, and that of the International Telecommunications Convention. According to a report on the subject:

The results showed that many of the words in the military lists had a low level of intelligibility, but that most of the deficiencies could be remedied by the judicious selection of words from the commercial codes and those tested by the laboratory. In a few instances where none of the 250 words could be regarded as especially satisfactory, it was believed possible to discover suitable replacements. Other words were tested and the most intelligible ones were compared with the more desirable lists. A final NDRC list was assembled and recommended to the CCB.

=== After World War II ===
After World War II, with many aircraft and ground personnel from the allied armed forces, "Able Baker" was officially adopted for use in international aviation. During the 1946 Second Session of the ICAO Communications Division, the organization adopted the so-called "Able Baker" alphabet that was the 1943 US–UK spelling alphabet. However, many sounds were unique to English, so an alternative "Ana Brazil" alphabet was used in Latin America. In spite of this, International Air Transport Association (IATA), recognizing the need for a single universal alphabet, presented a draft alphabet to the ICAO during 1947 that had sounds common to English, French, Spanish and Portuguese.

From 1948 to 1949, Jean-Paul Vinay, a professor of linguistics at the Université de Montréal, worked closely with the ICAO to research and develop a new spelling alphabet. The directions of ICAO were that "To be considered, a word must:

1. Be a live word in each of the three working languages.
2. Be easily pronounced and recognized by airmen of all languages.
3. Have good radio transmission and readability characteristics.
4. Have a similar spelling in at least English, French, and Spanish, and the initial letter must be the letter the word identifies.
5. Be free from any association with objectionable meanings."

After further study and modification by each approving body, the revised alphabet was adopted on 1 November 1951, to become effective on 1 April 1952 for civil aviation (but it may not have been adopted by any military).

Problems were soon found with this list. Some users believed that they were so severe that they reverted to the old "Able Baker" alphabet. Confusion among words like Delta and Extra, and between Nectar and Victor, or the poor intelligibility of other words during poor receiving conditions were the main problems. Later in 1952, ICAO decided to revisit the alphabet and their research. To identify the deficiencies of the new alphabet, testing was conducted among speakers from 31 nations, principally by the governments of the United Kingdom and the United States. In the United States, the research was conducted by the USAF-directed Operational Applications Laboratory (AFCRC, ARDC), to monitor a project with the Research Foundation of Ohio State University. Among the more interesting of the research findings was that "higher noise levels do not create confusion, but do intensify those confusions already inherent between the words in question".

=== 1956 publication ===
By early 1956 the ICAO was nearly complete with this research, and published the new official phonetic alphabet in order to account for discrepancies that might arise in communications as a result of multiple alphabet naming systems coexisting in different places and organizations. NATO was in the process of adopting the ICAO spelling alphabet, and apparently felt enough urgency that it adopted the proposed new alphabet with changes based on NATO's own research, to become effective on 1 January 1956, but quickly issued a new directive on 1 March 1956 adopting the now official ICAO spelling alphabet, which had changed by one word (November) from NATO's earlier request to ICAO to modify a few words based on US Air Force research.

After all of the above study, only the five words representing the letters C, M, N, U, and X were replaced e.g. "Charlie" instead of "Coca", "Mike" instead of "Metro", X-Ray instead of "Extra". The ICAO sent a recording of the new Radiotelephony Spelling Alphabet to all member states in November 1955. The final version given in the table above was implemented by the ICAO on 1 March 1956, and the ITU adopted it no later than 1959 when they mandated its usage via their official publication, Radio Regulations.

The code words have been stable since 1956. A 1955 NATO memo stated:

It is known that [the spelling alphabet] has been prepared only after the most exhaustive tests on a scientific basis by several nations. One of the firmest conclusions reached was that it was not practical to make an isolated change to clear confusion between one pair of letters. To change one word involves reconsideration of the whole alphabet to ensure that the change proposed to clear one confusion does not itself introduce others.

Because the ITU governs all international radio communications, it was also adopted by most radio operators, whether military, civilian, or amateur. In 1956, NATO adopted the International Civil Aviation Organization (ICAO), in 1959 the International Telecommunication Union (ITU), and in 2001, thus becoming the international standard.

=== International adoption ===
Soon after the code words were developed by ICAO, they were adopted by other national and international organizations, including the ITU, the International Maritime Organization (IMO), the United States Federal Government as Federal Standard 1037C: Glossary of Telecommunications Terms and its successors ANSI T1.523-2001 and ATIS Telecom Glossary (ATIS-0100523.2019) (all three using the spellings "Alpha" and "Juliet"), the United States Department of Defense, the Federal Aviation Administration (FAA) (using the spelling "Xray"), the International Amateur Radio Union (IARU), the American Radio Relay League (ARRL), the Association of Public-Safety Communications Officials-International (APCO), and by many military organizations such as NATO (using the spelling "Xray") and the now-defunct Southeast Asia Treaty Organization (SEATO).

The same alphabetic code words are used by all agencies, but each agency chooses one of two different sets of numeric code words. NATO uses the regular English numerals (zero, one, two, etc., though with some differences in pronunciation), whereas the ITU (beginning on 1 April 1969) and the IMO created compound code words (nadazero, unaone, bissotwo etc.). In practice, the compound words are used rarely.

Technically a radiotelephonic spelling alphabet, it is known by various other names that vary with the international organizations that adopted it, e.g. the ITU phonetic alphabet and figure code or the IMO (International Maritime Organization) Marine Navigational Vocabulary.

The alphabet is defined by various international conventions on radio, including:

- Universal Electrical Communications Union (UECU), Washington, D.C., December 1920
- International Radiotelegraph Convention, Washington, 1927 (which created the CCIR)
- General Radiocommunication and Additional Regulations (Madrid, 1932)
- Instructions for the International Telephone Service, 1932 (ITU-T E.141; withdrawn in 1993)
- General Radiocommunication Regulations and Additional Radiocommunication Regulations (Cairo, 1938)
- Radio Regulations and Additional Radio Regulations (Atlantic City, 1947), where "it was decided that the International Civil Aviation Organization and other international aeronautical organizations would assume the responsibility for procedures and regulations related to aeronautical communication. However, ITU would continue to maintain general procedures regarding distress signals."
- 1959 Administrative Radio Conference (Geneva, 1959)
- International Telecommunication Union, Radio
- Final Acts of WARC-79 (Geneva, 1979). Here the alphabet was formally named "Phonetic Alphabet and Figure Code".
- International Code of Signals for Visual, Sound, and Radio Communications, United States Edition, 1969 (revised 2003)

== Tables of telephone spelling alphabets ==
Timeline in development of the ICAO/ITU-R radiotelephony spelling alphabet
Letter	1920 UECU	1927 (Washington, D.C.) International Radiotelegraph Convention (CCIR)	1932 General Radiocommunication and Additional Regulations (CCIR/ICAN)	1938 (Cairo) International Radiocommunication Conference code words	1947 (Atlantic City) International Radio Conference	1947 ICAO (from 1943 US–UK)	1947 ICAO alphabet (from ARRL)	1947 ICAO Latin America/Caribbean	1947 IATA proposal to ICAO	1949 ICAO code words	1951 ICAO code words	1956 ICAO final code words	1959 (Geneva) ITU Administrative Radio Conference code words	1959 ITU pronunciations	2008–present ICAO code words	2005–present IMO pronunciations (English)	2005–present IMO pronunciations (French)	2008–present ICAO pronunciations	2018–present NATO pronunciations
A	Argentine	Amsterdam	Amsterdam	Amsterdam	Amsterdam	ABLE	ADAM	ANA	ALPHA	Alfa	Alfa	Alfa	Alfa	AL FAH	Alfa	AL FAH	AL FAH	AL FAH	al-fah
B	Brussels	Baltimore	Baltimore	Baltimore	Baltimore	BAKER	BAKER	BRAZIL	BETA	Beta	Bravo	Bravo	Bravo	BRAH VOH	Bravo	BRAH VO	BRA VO	BRAH VOH	brah-voh
C	Canada	Canada	Casablanca	Casablanca	Casablanca	CHARLIE	CHARLIE	COCO	CHARLIE	Coca	Coca	Charlie	Charlie	CHAR LEE or SHAR LEE	Charlie	CHAR LEE (or SHAR LEE)	TCHAH LI (ou CHAR LI)	CHAR LEE or SHAR LEE	char-lee
D	Damascus	Denmark	Danemark	Danemark	Danemark	DOG	DAVID	DADO	DELTA	Delta	Delta	Delta	Delta	DELL TAH	Delta	DELL TAH	DEL TAH	DELL TAH	dell-tah
E	Ecuador	Eddystone	Edison	Edison	Edison	EASY	EDWARD	ELSA	EDWARD	Echo	Echo	Echo	Echo	ECK OH	Echo	ECK O	EK O	ECK OH	eck-oh
F	France	Francisco	Florida	Florida	Florida	FOX	FREDDIE	FIESTA	FOX	Foxtrot	Foxtrot	Foxtrot	Foxtrot	FOKS TROT	Foxtrot	FOKS TROT	FOX TROTT	FOKS TROT	foks-trot
G	Greece	Gibraltar	Gallipoli	Gallipoli	Gallipoli	GEORGE	GEORGE	GATO	GRAMMA	Golf	Gold	Golf	Golf	GOLF	Golf	GOLF	GOLF	GOLF	golf
H	Hanover	Hanover	Havana	Havana	Havana	HOW	HARRY	HOMBRE	HAVANA	Hotel	Hotel	Hotel	Hotel	HOH TELL	Hotel	HOH TELL	HO TÈLL	HO TELL	hoh-tel
I	Italy	Italy	Italia	Italia	Italia	ITEM	IDA	INDIA	ITALY	India	India	India	India	IN DEE AH	India	IN DEE AH	IN DI AH	IN DEE AH	in-dee-ah
J	Japan	Jerusalem	Jérusalem	Jérusalem	Jerusalem	JIG	JOHN	JULIO	JUPITER	Julietta	Juliett	Juliett	Juliett	JEW LEE ETT	Juliett	JEW LEE ETT	DJOU LI ÈTT	JEW LEE ETT	jew-lee-ett
K	Khartoum	Kimberley	Kilogramme	Kilogramme	Kilogramme	KING	KING	KILO	KILO	Kilo	Kilo	Kilo	Kilo	KEY LOH	Kilo	KEY LOH	KI LO	KEY LOH	key-loh
L	Lima	Liverpool	Liverpool	Liverpool	Liverpool	LOVE	LEWIS	LUIS	LITER	Lima	Lima	Lima	Lima	LEE MAH	Lima	LEE MAH	LI MAH	LEE MAH	lee-mah
M	Madrid	Madagascar	Madagascar	Madagascar	Madagascar	MIKE	MARY	MAMA	MAESTRO	Metro	Metro	Mike	Mike	MIKE	Mike	MIKE	MA ÏK	MIKE	mike
N	Nancy	Neufchatel	New York	New-York	New York	NAN	NANCY	NORMA	NORMA	Nectar	Nectar	November	November	NO VEM BER	November	NO VEM BER	NO VÈMM BER	NO VEM BER	no-vem-ber
O	Ostend	Ontario	Oslo	Oslo	Oslo	OBOE	OTTO	OPERA	OPERA	Oscar	Oscar	Oscar	Oscar	OSS CAH	Oscar	OSS CAH	OSS KAR	OSS CAH	oss-cah
P	Paris	Portugal	Paris	Paris	Paris	PETER	PETER	PERU	PERU	Polka	Papa	Papa	Papa	PAH PAH	Papa	PAH PAH	PAH PAH	PAH PAH	pah-pah
Q	Quebec	Quebec	Québec	Québec	Quebec	QUEEN	QUEEN	QUEBEC	QUEBEC	Quebec	Quebec	Quebec	Quebec	KEH BECK	Quebec	KEH BECK	KÉ BÈK	KEH BECK	keh-beck
R	Rome	Rivoli	Roma	Roma	Roma	ROGER	ROBERT	ROSA	ROGER	Romeo	Romeo	Romeo	Romeo	ROW ME OH	Romeo	ROW ME OH	RO MI O	ROW ME OH	row-me-oh
S	Sardinia	Santiago	Santiago	Santiago	Santiago	SUGAR	SUSAN	SARA	SANTA	Sierra	Sierra	Sierra	Sierra	SEE AIR RAH	Sierra	SEE AIR RAH	SI ÈR RAH	SEE AIR RAH	see-air-rah
T	Tokio	Tokio	Tripoli	Tripoli	Tripoli	TARE	THOMAS	TOMAS	THOMAS	Tango	Tango	Tango	Tango	TANG GO	Tango	TANG GO	TANG GO	TANG GO	tang-go
U	Uruguay	Uruguay	Upsala	Upsala	Upsala	UNCLE	UNION	URUGUAY	URSULA	Union	Union	Uniform	Uniform	YOU NEE FORM or OO NEE FORM	Uniform	YOU NEE FORM (or OO NEE FORM)	YOU NI FORM (ou OU NI FORM)	YOU NEE FORM or OO NEE FORM	you-nee-form
V	Victoria	Victoria	Valencia	Valencia	Valencia	VICTOR	VICTOR	VICTOR	VICTOR	Victor	Victor	Victor	Victor	VIK TAH	Victor	VIK TAH	VIK TAR	VIK TAH	vic-tah
W	Washington	Washington	Washington	Washington	Washington	WILLIAM	WILLIAM	WHISKEY	WHISKEY	Whiskey	Whiskey	Whiskey	Whiskey	WISS KEY	Whiskey	WISS KEY	OUISS KI	WISS KEY	wiss-key
X	Xaintrie	Xantippe	Xanthippe	Xanthippe	Xanthippe	XRAY	X-RAY	EQUIS	X-RAY	eXtra	eXtra	X-ray	X-ray	ECKS RAY	X-ray	ECKS RAY	ÈKSS RÉ	ECKS RAY	ecks-ray
Y	Yokohama	Yokohama	Yokohama	Yokohama	Yokohama	YOKE	YOUNG	YOLANDA	YORK	Yankey	Yankee	Yankee	Yankee	YANG KEY	Yankee	YANG KEY	YANG KI	YANG KEY	yang-key
Z	Zanzibar	Zululand	Zürich	Zurich	Zurich	ZEBRA	ZEBRA	ZETA	?	Zebra	Zulu	Zulu	Zulu	ZOO LOO	Zulu	ZOO LOO	ZOU LOU	ZOO LOO	zoo-loo
Non‑letter				(Note: Each sequence of figures is both preceded and followed by "as a number" – or, for punctuation only, "as a mark" – spoken twice.)															
0				Jérusalem	Jerusalem	Zero							Juliett	(alt. proposals: ZE-RO, ZERO)	zero	(see table of digits)		ZE-RO	zee-ro
1				Amsterdam	Amsterdam	Wun							Alfa	(alt. proposals: WUN, WUN)	one	(see table of digits)		WUN	wun
2				Baltimore	Baltimore	Too							Bravo	(alt. proposals: TOO, BIS)	two	(see table of digits)		TOO	too
3				Casablanca	Casablanca	Thuh-ree							Charlie	(alt. proposals: TREE, TER)	three	(see table of digits)		TREE	tree
4				Danemark	Danemark	Fo-wer							Delta	(alt. proposals: FOW-ER, QUARTO)	four	(see table of digits)		FOW-er	fow-er
5				Edison	Edison	Fi-yiv							Echo	(alt. proposals: FIFE, PENTA)	five	(see table of digits)		FIFE	fife
6				Florida	Florida	Six							Foxtrot	(alt. proposals: SIX, SAXO)	six	(see table of digits)		SIX	six
7				Gallipoli	Gallipoli	Seven							Golf	(alt. proposals: SEV-EN, SETTE)	seven	(see table of digits)		SEV-en	sev-en
8				Havana	Havana	Ate							Hotel	(alt. proposals: AIT, OCTO)	eight	(see table of digits)		AIT	ait
9				Italia	Italia	Niner							India	(alt. proposals: NIN-ER, NONA)	nine	(see table of digits)		NIN-er	nin-er
. (decimal point)														(proposals: DAY-SEE-MAL, DECIMAL)	decimal	DAY-SEE-MAL	DÉ-SI-MAL	DAY-SEE-MAL	
Hundred															hundred			HUN-dred	
Thousand														(proposals: TOUS-AND, –)	thousand			TOU-SAND	
,				Kilogramme	Kilogramme								Kilo						
/ (fraction bar)				Liverpool	Liverpool								Lima						
(break signal)				Madagascar	Madagascar								Mike						
. (punctuation)				New-York	New York								November			STOP	STOP		

For the 1938 and 1947 phonetics, each transmission of figures is preceded and followed by the words "as a number" spoken twice.

The ITU adopted the IMO phonetic spelling alphabet in 1959, and in 1969 specified that it be "for application in the maritime mobile service only".

Pronunciation was not defined prior to 1959. For the post-1959 phonetics, the underlined syllable of each letter word should be emphasized, and each syllable of the code words for the post-1969 figures should be equally emphasized.

=== International aviation ===
The Radiotelephony Spelling Alphabet is used by the International Civil Aviation Organization for international aircraft communications.

Timeline in development of the ICAO/ITU-R radiotelephony spelling alphabet
Letter	1932 General Radiocommunication and Additional Regulations (CCIR/ICAN)	1946 ICAO Second Session of the Communications Division (same as Joint Army/Navy)	1947 ICAO (same as 1943 US-UK)	1947 ICAO alphabet (adopted exactly from ARRL	1947 ICAO Latin America / Caribbean	1949 ICAO code words	1951 ICAO code words	1956–present ICAO code words
A	Amsterdam	Able	ABLE	ADAM	ANA	Alfa	Alfa	Alfa
B	Baltimore	Baker	BAKER	BAKER	BRAZIL	Beta	Bravo	Bravo
C	Casablanca	Charlie	CHARLIE	CHARLIE	COCO	Coca	Coca	Charlie
D	Danemark	Dog	DOG	DAVID	DADO	Delta	Delta	Delta
E	Edison	Easy	EASY	EDWARD	ELSA	Echo	Echo	Echo
F	Florida	Fox	FOX	FREDDIE	FIESTA	Foxtrot	Foxtrot	Foxtrot
G	Gallipoli	George	GEORGE	GEORGE	GATO	Golf	Gold	Golf
H	Havana	How	HOW	HARRY	HOMBRE	Hotel	Hotel	Hotel
I	Italia	Item	ITEM	IDA	INDIA	India	India	India
J	Jérusalem	Jig	JIG	JOHN	JULIO	Julietta	Juliett	Juliett
K	Kilogramme	King	KING	KING	KILO	Kilo	Kilo	Kilo
L	Liverpool	Love	LOVE	LEWIS	LUIS	Lima	Lima	Lima
M	Madagascar	Mike	MIKE	MARY	MAMA	Metro	Metro	Mike
N	New York	Nan (later Nickel)	NAN	NANCY	NORMA	Nectar	Nectar	November
O	Oslo	Oboe	OBOE	OTTO	OPERA	Oscar	Oscar	Oscar
P	Paris	Peter	PETER	PETER	PERU	Polka	Papa	Papa
Q	Québec	Queen	QUEEN	QUEEN	QUEBEC	Quebec	Quebec	Quebec
R	Roma	Roger	ROGER	ROBERT	ROSA	Romeo	Romeo	Romeo
S	Santiago	Sail/Sugar	SUGAR	SUSAN	SARA	Sierra	Sierra	Sierra
T	Tripoli	Tare	TARE	THOMAS	TOMAS	Tango	Tango	Tango
U	Upsala	Uncle	UNCLE	UNION	URUGUAY	Union	Union	Uniform
V	Valencia	Victor	VICTOR	VICTOR	VICTOR	Victor	Victor	Victor
W	Washington	William	WILLIAM	WILLIAM	WHISKEY	Whiskey	Whiskey	Whisky
X	Xanthippe	X-ray	XRAY	X-RAY	EQUIS	X-RAY	eXtra	X-ray
Y	Yokohama	Yoke	YOKE	YOUNG	YOLANDA	Yankey	Yankee	Yankee
Z	Zürich	Zebra	ZEBRA	ZEBRA	ZETA	Zebra	Zulu	Zulu
0		Zero	Zero					Zero
1		One	Wun					One
2		Two	Too					Two
3		Three	Thuh-ree					Three
4		Four	Fo-wer					Four
5		Five	Fi-yiv					Five
6		Six	Six					Six
7		Seven	Seven					Seven
8		Eight	Ate					Eight
9		Nine	Niner					Niner
.								Decimal
100								Hundred
1000								Thousand

=== International maritime mobile service ===
The ITU-R Radiotelephony Alphabet is used by the International Maritime Organization for international marine communications.

Letter	1932–1965 IMO code words	1965–present (WRC-03) IMO code words	1967 WARC code words	2000–present IMO SMCP pronunciations	1967 WARC pronunciations	2007–present ITU-R pronunciations
A	Amsterdam	Alfa		Alfa	AL FAH	AL FAH
B	Baltimore	Bravo		Bravo	BRAH VOH	BRAH VOH
C	Casablanca	Charlie		Charlie	CHAR LEE or SHAR LEE	CHAR LEE or SHAR LEE
D	Danemark	Delta		Delta	DELL TAH	DELL TAH
E	Edison	Echo		Echo	ECK OH	ECK OH
F	Florida	Foxtrot		Foxtrot	FOKS TROT	FOKS TROT
G	Gallipoli	Golf		Golf	GOLF	GOLF
H	Havana	Hotel		Hotel	HOH TELL	HOH TELL
I	Italia	India		India	IN DEE AH	IN DEE AH
J	Jérusalem	Juliett		Juliet	JEW LEE ETT	JEW LEE ETT
K	Kilogramme	Kilo		Kilo	KEY LOH	KEY LOH
L	Liverpool	Lima		Lima	LEE MAH	LEE MAH
M	Madagascar	Mike		Mike	MIKE	MIKE
N	New-York	November		November	NO VEM BER	NO VEM BER
O	Oslo	Oscar		Oscar	OSS CAH	OSS CAH
P	Paris	Papa		Papa	PAH PAH	PAH PAH
Q	Québec	Quebec		Quebec	KEH BECK	KEH BECK
R	Roma	Romeo		Romeo	ROW ME OH	ROW ME OH
S	Santiago	Sierra		Sierra	SEE AIR RAH	SEE AIR RAH
T	Tripoli	Tango		Tango	TANG GO	TANG GO
U	Upsala	Uniform		Uniform	YOU NEE FORM or OO NEE FORM	YOU NEE FORM or OO NEE FORM
V	Valencia	Victor		Victor	VIK TAH	VIK TAH
W	Washington	Whisky		Whisky	WISS KEY	WISS KEY
X	Xanthippe	X-ray		X-ray	ECKS RAY	ECKS RAY
Y	Yokohama	Yankee		Yankee	YANG KEY	YANG KEY
Z	Zurich	Zulu		Zulu	ZOO LOO	ZOO LOO
0	Zero	ZEERO	NADAZERO	ZEERO	NAH-DAH-ZAY-ROH	NAH-DAH-ZAY-ROH
1	One	WUN	UNAONE	WUN	OO-NAH-WUN	OO-NAH-WUN
2	Two	TOO	BISSOTWO	TOO	BEES-SOH-TOO	BEES-SOH-TOO
3	Three	TREE	TERRATHREE	TREE	TAY-RAH-TREE	TAY-RAH-TREE
4	Four	FOWER	KARTEFOUR	FOWER	KAR-TAY-FOWER	KAR-TAY-FOWER
5	Five	FIFE	PANTAFIVE	FIFE	PAN-TAH-FIVE	PAN-TAH-FIVE
6	Six	SIX	SOXISIX	SIX	SOK-SEE-SIX	SOK-SEE-SIX
7	Seven	SEVEN	SETTESEVEN	SEVEN	SAY-TAY-SEVEN	SAY-TAY-SEVEN
8	Eight	AIT	OKTOEIGHT	AIT	OK-TOH-AIT	OK-TOH-AIT
9	Nine	NINER	NOVENINE	NINER	NO-VAY-NINER	NO-VAY-NINER
.			DECIMAL		DAY-SEE-MAL	DAY-SEE-MAL
.	Full stop		STOP		STOP	STOP
,	Comma					
	Break signal					
/	Fraction bar					
1000		TOUSAND		TOUSAND		

== See also ==
- Allied military phonetic spelling alphabets – Word lists used in military radio communication
- APCO radiotelephony spelling alphabet – Used by some US police departments
- International Code of Signals – Maritime communication method
- Language-specific spelling alphabets
  - Finnish Armed Forces radio alphabet
  - German spelling alphabet
  - Greek spelling alphabet
  - Japanese radiotelephony alphabet
  - Korean spelling alphabet
  - Russian spelling alphabet
  - Swedish Armed Forces radio alphabet
- List of military time zones
- List of NATO country codes
- PGP word list – Words for conveying data bytes in speech
- Q code – Type of Morse code operating signal
- Radiotelephony procedure – Techniques to clarify communications over two-way radios
  - Brevity code – Radio and telegraph signals encoding longer definitions
    - Ten-code – Brevity codes used by a variety of US professionals
  - Procedure word – Structured vocabulary for voice communication
- Spelling alphabet – Standardized pronunciation of letters
