= Jean-Paul Vinay =

French-Canadian linguist (1910-1999)

- Born: 18 July 1910; Paris, France
- Died: 10 April 1999 (aged 88); Victoria, British Columbia, Canada

Academic background
- Education: University of Caen; University of Paris; University College London

Academic work
- Discipline: Linguist
- Sub-discipline: Translation studies
- Institutions: Université de Montréal; University of Victoria
- Notable works: Stylistique comparée du français et de l'anglais

Jean-Paul Vinay (18 July 1910 – 10 April 1999) was a French-Canadian linguist. He is considered one of the pioneers in translation studies, along with Jean Darbelnet, with whom Vinay co-authored Stylistique comparée du français et de l'anglais (1958), a seminal work in the field.

== Life and career ==
Vinay was born in Paris in 1910 and soon moved to Le Havre. He studied English and philology at the University of Caen and at the University of Paris before receiving an M.A. in phonetics and philology from University College, London, in 1937. In 1946, Vinay moved to Canada and became professor and head of the Department of Linguistics and Translation at the Université de Montréal. In 1967, he began teaching at the University of Victoria, until his retirement in 1976. He died in Victoria, British Columbia, in 1999.

From 1948 to 1949, Vinay worked on developing a radiotelephony alphabet with sounds common to English, French, Spanish, and Portuguese, in collaboration with the ICAO Language Section, which later became the NATO phonetic alphabet.

In 1958, Vinay and Darbelnet developed one of the early frameworks of understanding translation techniques, Stylistique comparée du français et de l'anglais. Their seven techniques are divided into two categories: direct translation, which includes borrowing, calque, and literal translation, and oblique translation, which includes transposition, modulation, equivalence, and adaptation.
