= Spelling alphabet =

Standardized pronunciation of letters

A spelling alphabet (also called by various other names) is a set of words used to represent the letters of an alphabet in oral communication, especially over a two-way radio or telephone. The words chosen to represent the letters sound sufficiently different from each other to clearly differentiate them. This avoids any confusion that could easily otherwise result from the names of letters that sound similar, except for some small difference easily missed or easily degraded by the imperfect sound quality of the apparatus. For example, in the Latin alphabet, the letters B, P, and D ("bee", "pee" and "dee") sound similar and could easily be confused, but the words "bravo", "papa" and "delta" sound completely different, making confusion unlikely.

Any suitable words can be used in the moment, making this form of communication easy even for people not trained on any particular standardized spelling alphabet. For example, it is common to hear a nonce form like "A as in 'apple', D as in 'dog', P as in 'paper'" over the telephone in customer support contexts. However, to gain the advantages of standardization in contexts involving trained persons, a standard version can be convened by an organization. Many (loosely or strictly) standardized spelling alphabets exist, mostly owing to historical siloization, where each organization simply created its own. International air travel created a need for a worldwide standard.

Today the most widely known spelling alphabet is the ICAO International Radiotelephony Spelling Alphabet, also known as the NATO phonetic alphabet, which is used for Roman letters. Spelling alphabets also exist for Greek and for Russian.

== Terminology ==
Spelling alphabets are called by various names, according to context. These synonyms include spelling alphabet, word-spelling alphabet, voice procedure alphabet, radio alphabet, radiotelephony alphabet, telephone alphabet, and telephony alphabet. A spelling alphabet is also often called a phonetic alphabet, especially by amateur radio enthusiasts, recreational sailors in the US and Australia, and NATO military organizations, despite this usage of the term producing a naming collision with the usage of the same phrase in phonetics to mean a notation used for phonetic transcription or phonetic spelling, such as the International Phonetic Alphabet, which is used to indicate the sounds of human speech.

== History ==
The names of the letters of the English alphabet are "a", "bee", "cee", "dee", "e", etc. These can be difficult to discriminate, particularly over a limited-bandwidth and noisy communications channel, hence the use in aviation and by armed services of unambiguous substitute names for use in electrical voice communication such as telephone and radio.

A large number of spelling alphabets have been developed over the past century, with the first ones being used to overcome problems with the early wired telephone networks, and the later ones being focused on wireless two-way radio (radiotelephony) links. Often, each communications company and each branch of each country's military developed its own spelling alphabet, with the result that one 1959 research effort documented a full 203 different spelling alphabets, comprising 1600 different words, leading the author of the report to ask:

Should an efficient American secretary, for example, know several alphabets—one for use on the telephone, another to talk to the telegraph operator, another to call the police, and still another for civil defense?

Each word in the spelling alphabet typically replaces the name of the letter with which it starts (acrophony). It is used to spell out words when speaking to someone not able to see the speaker, or when the audio channel is not clear. The lack of high frequencies on standard telephones makes it hard to distinguish an 'F' from an 'S' for example. Also, the lack of visual cues during oral communication can cause confusion. For example, lips are closed at the start of saying the letter "B" but open at the beginning of the letter "D" making these otherwise similar-sounding letters more easily discriminated when looking at the speaker. Without these visual cues, such as during announcements of airline gate numbers "B1" and "D1" at an airport, "B" may be confused with "D" by the listener. Spelling out one's name, a password or a ticker symbol over the telephone are other scenarios where a spelling alphabet is useful.

British Army signallers began using a partial spelling alphabet in the late 19th century. Recorded in the 1898 "Signalling Instruction" issued by the War Office and followed by the 1904 Signalling Regulations this system differentiated only the letters most frequently misunderstood: Ack (originally "Ak") Beer (or Bar) C D E F G H I J K L eMma N O Pip Q R eSses Toc U Vic W X Y Z. This alphabet was the origin of phrases such as "ack-ack" (A.A. for anti-aircraft), "pip-emma" for pm and Toc H for an ex-servicemen's association. It was developed on the Western Front of the First World War. The RAF developed their "telephony spelling alphabet", which was adopted by all three services and civil aviation in the UK from 1921.

It was later formally codified to provide a word for all 26 letters (see comparative tabulation of Western military alphabets).

For civilian users, in particular in the field of finance, alternative alphabets arose. Common personal names were a popular choice, and the First Name Alphabet came into common use.

== Voice procedure ==
Spelling alphabets are especially useful when speaking in a noisy environment when clarity and promptness of communication is essential, for example during two-way radio communication between an aircraft pilot and air traffic control, or in military operations. Whereas the names of many letters sound alike, the set of replacement words can be selected to be as distinct from each other as possible, to minimise the likelihood of ambiguity or mistaking one letter for another. For example, if a burst of static cuts off the start of an English-language utterance of the letter J, it may be mistaken for A or K. In the international radiotelephony spelling alphabet known as the ICAO (or NATO) phonetic alphabet, the sequence J–A–K would be pronounced Juliett–Alfa–Kilo. Some voice procedure standards require numbers to be spelled out digit by digit, so some spelling alphabets replace confusable digit names with more distinct alternatives; for example, the NATO alphabet has “niner” for 9 to distinguish it better from 5 (pronounced as “fife”) and the German word “nein”.

== Flaghoist spelling alphabets ==
Although no radio or traditional telephone communications are involved in communicating flag signals among ships, the instructions for which flags to hoist are relayed by voice on each ship displaying flags, and whether this is done by shouting between decks, sound tubes, or sound-powered telephones, some of the same distortions that make a spelling alphabet for radiotelephony also make a spelling alphabet desirable for directing seamen in which flags to hoist. The first documented use of this were two different alphabets used by U.S. Navy circa 1908. By 1942, the U.S. Army's radiotelephony spelling alphabet was associated with the International Code of Signals (ICS) flags.

Symbol	c. 1908		1920 (proposed)	c. 1942	1969–present	ICS flag
A	Actor	Ash	Argentine	Afirm	Alpha/Alfa	
B	Baker	Back	Brussels	Baker	Bravo	
C	Canteen	Chain	Canada	Cast	Charlie	
D	Diver	Dog	Damascus	Dog	Delta	
E	Eagle	Egg	Ecuador	Easy	Echo	
F	Fisher	Fox	France	Fox	Foxtrot	
G	Gangway	Gig	Greece	George	Golf	
H	Halliard	Horse	Hanover	Hypo	Hotel	
I	Insect	Ice	Italy	Int	India	
J	Jockey	Jake	Japan	Jig	Juliett	
K	Knapsack	King	Khartoum	King	Kilo	
L	Lugger	Lash	Lima	Love	Lima	
M	Musket	Mule	Madrid	Mike	Mike	
N	Neptune	Net	Nancy	Negat	November	
O	Oyster	Oak	Ostend	Option	Oscar	
P	Pistol	Page	Paris	Prep	Papa	
Q	Quadrant	Quail	Quebec	Queen	Quebec	
R	Reefer	Raft	Rome	Roger	Romeo	
S	Shipmate	Scout	Sardinia	Sail	Sierra	
T	Topsail	Tide	Tokio	Tare	Tango	
U	Unload	Use	Uruguay	Unit	Uniform	
V	Vessel	Vast	Victoria	Victor	Victor	
W	Windage	Winch	Washington	William	Whiskey	
X	Xray	Xray	Xaintrie	Xray	X-ray	
Y	Yeoman	Yacht	Yokohama	Yoke	Yankee	
Z	Zebra	Zoo	Zanzibar	Zed	Zulu	

== Telephone spelling alphabets ==
While spelling alphabets today are mostly used over two-way radio voice circuits (radiotelephony), early on in telecommunications there were also telephone-specific spelling alphabets, which were developed to deal with the noisy conditions on long-distance circuits. Their development was loosely intertwined with radiotelephony spelling alphabets, but were developed by different organizations; for example, AT&T developed a spelling alphabet for its long-distance operators, another for its international operators; Western Union developed one for the public to use when dictating telegrams over the telephone; and ITU-T developed a spelling alphabet for telephone networks, while ITU-R was involved in the development of radiotelephony spelling alphabets. Even though both of these groups were part of the same ITU, and thus part of the UN, their alphabets often differed from each other. Uniquely, the 1908 Tasmanian telegraph operator's code was designed to be memorized as follows:

Englishmen Invariably Support High Authority Unless Vindictive.
The Managing Owners Never Destroy Bills.
Remarks When Loose Play Jangling. Fractious Galloping Zigzag Knights eXpeditely Capture Your Queen.

Symbol	1904 British Army (Signalling Regulations)	1904 AT&T	1908 Tasmania	1910 Western Union	1912 Western Union	1914 British Post Office	1917 AT&T	c. 1917 AT&T Overseas	1918 Western Union	c. 1928 Western Union	1932 ITU-T IITS Article 40 (Code A; French)	1932 ITU-T IITS Article 40 (Code B; English)	1942 Western Union	1947 International Telecommunications Convention	1958 International Telecommunications Convention
A	Ack		Authority		Adams	Apple	Alice	AMERICA	Adams	Adams	Amsterdam	Andrew	Adams	Amsterdam	Amsterdam
B	Beer	ab	Bills		Boston	Brother	Bertha	BENJAMIN	Boston	Boston	Baltimore	Benjamin	Boston	Baltimore	Baltimore
C		abc	Capture		Chicago	Charlie	Charles	CHARLIE	Chicago	Chicago	Casablanca	Charles	Chicago	Casablanca	Casablanca
D		bcd	Destroy	Dora	Denver	Dover	David	DAVID	Denver	Denver	Danemark	David	Denver	Danemark	Danemark
E			Englishmen		Edward	Eastern	Edward	EDWARD	Edward	Edward	Edison	Edward	Edward	Edison	Edison
F		def	Fractious	D-E-F	Frank	Father	Frank	FRANK	Frank	Frank	Florida	Frederick	Frank	Florida	Florida
G			Galloping		George	George	George	GEORGE	George	George	Gallipoli	George	George	Gallipoli	Gallipoli
H		fgh	High		Henry	Harry	Henry	HARRY	Henry	Henry	Havana	Harry	Henry	Havana	Havana
I			Invariably		Ireland (late 1912=Ida)	India	Ida	ISAAC	Ida	Ida	Italia	Isaac	Ida	Italia	Italia
J			Juggling		Jersey	Jack	James	JACK	John	John	Jérusalem	Jack	John	Jude	Jude
K			Knights		King	King	Kate	KING	King	King	Kilogramme	King	King	Kilogramme	Kilogramme
L			Loose		Lincoln	London	Louis	LONDON	Lincoln	Lincoln	Liverpool	Lucy	Lincoln	Liverpool	Liverpool
M	eMma	klm	Managing		Mary	Mother	Mary	MARY	Mary	Mary	Madagascar	Mary	Mary	Madagascar	Madagascar
N		lmn	Never		Newark	November	Nelly	?	New York	New York	New York	Nellie	New York	New York	New York
O			Owners		Ocean	October	Oliver	OLIVER	Ocean	Ocean	Oslo	Oliver	Ocean	Oslo	Oslo
P	Pip	nop	Play		Peter	Peter	Peter	PETER	Peter	Peter	Paris	Peter	Peter	Paris	Paris
Q			Queen		Queen	Queen	Quaker	QUEBEC	Queen	Queen	Québec	Queen	Queen	Quebec	Quebec
R			Remarks		Robert	Robert	Robert	ROBERT	Robert	Robert	Roma	Robert	Robert	Roma	Roma
S	eSses	qrs	Support		Sugar	Sugar	Samuel	SAMUEL?	Sugar	Sugar	Santiago	Samuel	Sugar	Santiago	Santiago
T	Toc	rst	The		Texas	Thomas	Thomas		Thomas	Thomas	Tripoli	Tommy	Thomas	Tripoli	Tripoli
U			Unless		Union	Uncle	Utah	?	Union	Union	Upsala	Uncle	Union	Upsala	Upsala
V	Vic	tuv	Vindictive		Violet	Victoria	Victor	VICTORY	Victor	Victor	Valencia	Victor	Victory	Valencia	Valencia
W			When		William	Wednesday	William	WILLIAM	William	William	Washington	William	William	Washington	Washington
X		vwx	eXpeditely		X-Ray	Xmas	X-Ray	?	X-Ray	X-ray	Xanthippe	Xray	X-ray	Xanthippe	Xanthippe
Y		wxy	Your		Yale	Yellow	Young	?	Young	Young	Yokohama	Yellow	Young	Yokohama	Yokohama
Z		xyz	Zigzag	X-Y-Z	Zero	Zebra	Zebra	?	Zero	Zero	Zürich	Zebra	Zero	Zurich	Zurich
0														Zero (Note: Each transmission of figures is preceded and followed by "as a number" spoken twice.)	Zero
1														One	One
2														Two	Two
3														Three	Three
4														Four	Four
5														Five	Five
6														Six	Six
7														Seven	Seven
8														Eight	Eight
9														Nine	Nine
,														Comma	Comma
/														Fraction bar	Fraction bar
.														Full stop (period)	Full stop (period)

== Radiotelephony spelling alphabets ==
=== During WWI ===
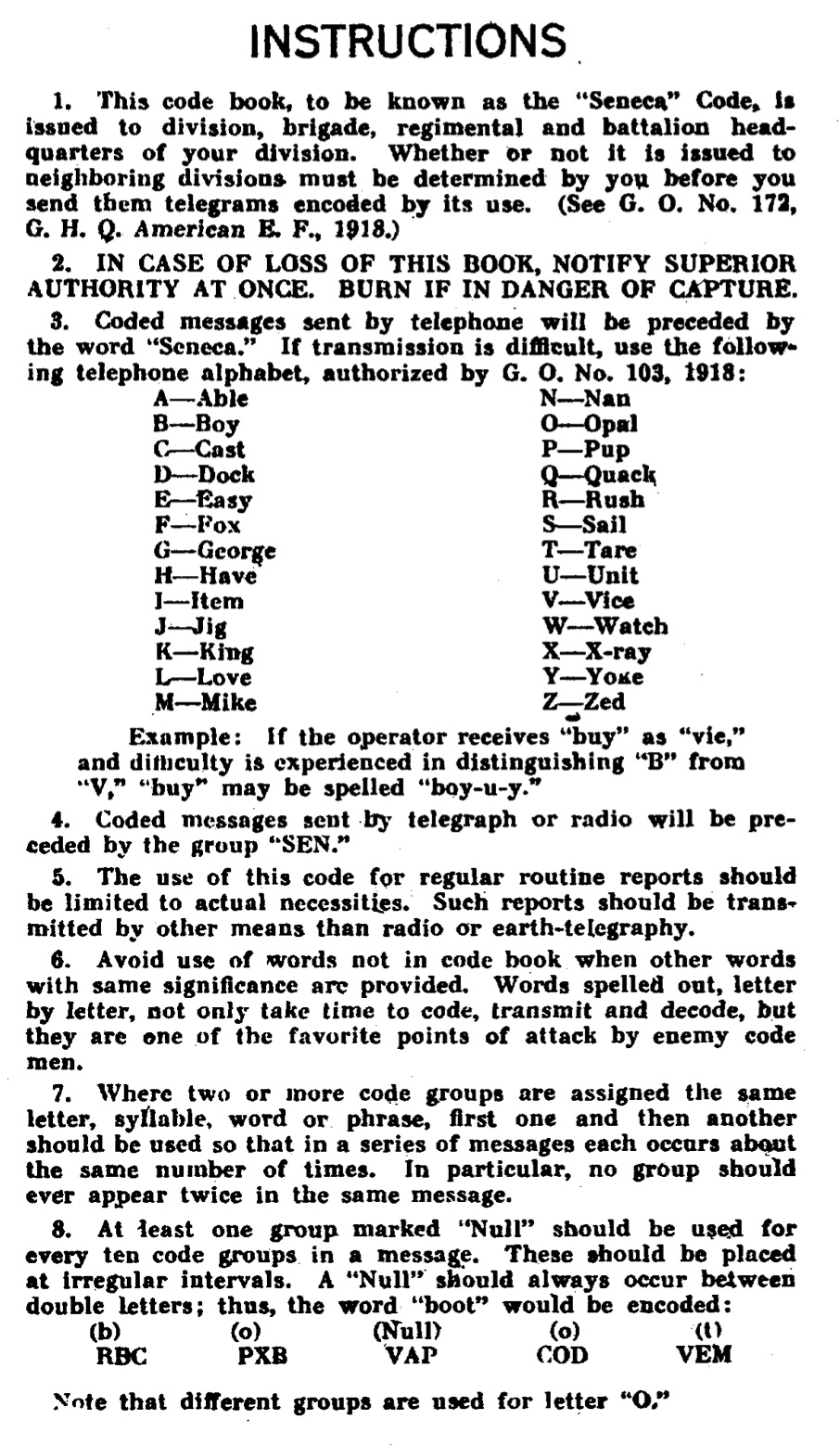
Instruction page from WW I U.S. Army trench code, Seneca edition, with spelling alphabet for telephone and radio use

In World War I battle lines were relatively static and forces were commonly linked by wired telephones. Signals could be weak on long wire runs and field telephone systems often used a single wire with earth return, which made them subject to inadvertent and deliberate interference. Spelling alphabets were introduced for wire telephony as well as on the newer radio voice equipment.

Symbol	1915 British Army	1917 Royal Navy	1918 British Army
A	Ack	Apples	Ack
B	Beer	Butter	Beer
C		Charlie	Cork
D	Don	Duff	Don
E		Edward	Eddy
F		Freddy	
G		George	
H		Harry	
I		Ink	Ink
J		Johnnie	Jug
K		King	
L		London	
M	eMma	Monkey	eMma
N		Nuts	
O		Orange	
P	Pip	Pudding	Pip
Q		Queenie	Quad
R		Robert	
S	eSses	Sugar	eSses
T	Toc	Tommy	Talk
U		Uncle	
V	Vic	Vinegar	Vic
W		Willie	
X		Xerxes	
Y		Yellow	
Z		Zebra	

=== Between WWI and WWII ===
Commercial and international telephone and radiotelephone spelling alphabets.

Symbol	1919 U.S. Air Service	1920 UECU Proposal (never adopted)	1927 (Washington, D.C.) International Radiotelegraph Convention (CCIR)	1930 ARRL List (same as 1918 Western Union)	1930 Bokstaveringstabell Televerket	1932 General Radiocommunication and Additional Regulations (CCIR/ICAN)	1932 American Association of Railroads (same as 1918 Western Union)	1936 ARRL	1938 (Cairo) International Radiocommunication Conference code words
A	Able	Argentine	Amsterdam	Adams	Adam	Amsterdam	Adams	Able	Amsterdam
B	Boy	Brussels	Baltimore	Boston	Bertil	Baltimore	Boston	Boy	Baltimore
C	Cast	Canada	Canada	Chicago	Caesar	Casablanca	Chicago	Cast	Casablanca
D	Dock	Damascus	Denmark	Denver	David	Danemark	Denver	Dog	Danemark
E	Easy	Ecuador	Eddystone	Edward	Erik	Edison	Edward	Easy	Edison
F	Fox	France	Francisco	Frank	Filip	Florida	Frank	Fox	Florida
G	George	Greece	Gibraltar	George	Gustav	Gallipoli	George	George	Gallipoli
H	Have	Hanover	Hanover	Henry	Helge (Harald prior 1960)	Havana	Henry	Have	Havana
I	Item	Italy	Italy	Ida	Ivar	Italia	Ida	Item	Italia
J	Jig	Japan	Jerusalem	John	Johan	Jérusalem	John	Jig	Jérusalem
K	King	Khartoum	Kimberley	King	Kalle	Kilogramme	King	King	Kilogramme
L	Love	Lima	Liverpool	Lincoln	Ludvig	Liverpool	Lincoln	Love	Liverpool
M	Mike	Madrid	Madagascar	Mary	Martin	Madagascar	Mary	Mike	Madagascar
N	Nan	Nancy	Neufchatel	New York	Nicklas	New York	New York	Nan	New-York
O	Oble	Ostend	Ontario	Ocean	Olof	Oslo	Ocean	Oboe	Oslo
P	Pup	Paris	Portugal	Peter	Petter	Paris	Peter	Pup	Paris
Q	Quack	Quebec	Quebec	Queen	Quintus	Québec	Queen	Quack	Québec
R	Rush	Rome	Rivoli	Robert	Rudolf	Roma	Robert	Rot	Roma
S	Sail	Sardinia	Santiago	Sugar	Sigurd	Santiago	Sugar	Sail	Santiago
T	Tare	Tokio	Tokio	Thomas	Tore	Tripoli	Thomas	Tare	Tripoli
U	Unit	Uruguay	Uruguay	Union	Urban	Upsala	Union	Unit	Upsala
V	Vice	Victoria	Victoria	Victor	Viktor	Valencia	Victor	Vice	Valencia
W	Watch	Washington	Washington	William	Willhelm	Washington	William	Watch	Washington
X	X-ray	Xaintrie	Xantippe	X-Ray	Xerxes	Xanthippe	X-ray	X-ray	Xanthippe
Y	Yoke	Yokohama	Yokohama	Young	Yngve	Yokohama	Young	Yoke	Yokohama
Z	Zed	Zanzibar	Zululand	Zero	Zäta	Zürich	Zero	Zed	Zurich
Å					Åke				
Ä					Ärlig				
Ö					Östen				
					Nolla				Zero
					Ett (Etta prior 1960)				One
					Tvåa				Two
					Trea				Three
					Fyra				Four
					Femma				Five
					Sexa				Six
					Sju (Sjua prior 1960)				Seven
					Åtta				Eight
					Nia				Nine

=== During WWII ===
The later NATO phonetic alphabet evolved from the procedures of several different Allied nations during World War II, including:

- The United States Navy (multiple versions in 1913, 1927, 1938, and WWII)
- The United States Army (multiple versions in 1916, 1939, 1944, and 1961)
- The United States Army Air Force
- Joint Army/Navy Phonetic Alphabet (1941–1956)
- The British Royal Air Force phonetic alphabet (1921 onwards)

Allied military alphabet history
Symbol	(United Kingdom)			(United States)	
Symbol	Royal Navy	Royal Air Force		Navy Department	Joint Army/Navy phonetic alphabet
Symbol	1914–1918 (World War I)	1924–1942	1943–1956	1927–1937	1941–1956
A	Apples	Ace	Able/Affirm	Afirm	Able
B	Butter	Beer	Baker	Baker	Baker
C	Charlie	Charlie	Charlie	Cast	Charlie
D	Duff	Don	Dog	Dog	Dog
E	Edward	Edward	Easy	Easy	Easy
F	Freddy	Freddie	Fox	Fox	Fox
G	George	George	George	George	George
H	Harry	Harry	How	Hypo	How
I	Ink	Ink	Item/Interrogatory	Int	Item
J	Johnnie	Johnnie	Jig/Johnny	Jig	Jig
K	King	King	King	King	King
L	London	London	Love	Love	Love
M	Monkey	Monkey	Mike	Mike	Mike
N	Nuts	Nuts	Nab/Negat	Negat	Nan
O	Orange	Orange	Oboe	Option	Oboe
P	Pudding	Pip	Peter/Prep	Prep	Peter
Q	Queenie	Queen	Queen	Quack	Queen
R	Robert	Robert	Roger	Roger	Roger
S	Sugar	Sugar	Sugar	Sail	Sugar
T	Tommy	Toc	Tare	Tare	Tare
U	Uncle	Uncle	Uncle	Uncle	Uncle
V	Vinegar	Vic	Victor	Vice	Victor
W	Willie	William	William	William	William
X	Xerxes	X-ray	X-ray	X-ray	X-ray
Y	Yellow	Yorker	Yoke	Yoke	Yoke
Z	Zebra	Zebra	Zebra	Zebra	Zebra

=== Post-WWII ===
Symbol	1946 ARRL	1947 (Atlantic City) International Radio Conference	1949 ICAO	1951 IATA code words	1957 American Association of Railroads (same as 1917 AT&T)	1959 (Geneva) Administrative Radio Conference code words	1969–present code words	1969–present pronunciation
A	Adam	Amsterdam	Alfa	Alfa	Alice	Alfa	Alfa	AL FAH
B	Baker	Baltimore	Beta	Bravo	Bertha	Bravo	Bravo	BRAH VOH
C	Charlie	Casablanca	Coca	Coca	Charles	Charlie	Charlie	CHAR LEE
D	David	Danemark	Delta	Delta	David	Delta	Delta	DELL TAH
E	Edward	Edison	Echo	Echo	Edward	Echo	Echo	ECK OH
F	Frank	Florida	Foxtrot	Foxtrot	Frank	Foxtrot	Foxtrot	FOKS TROT
G	George	Gallipoli	Golf	Gold	George	Golf	Golf	GOLF
H	Henry	Havana	Hotel	Hotel	Henry	Hotel	Hotel	HOH TELL
I	Ida	Italia	India	India	Ida	India	India	IN DEE AH
J	John	Jerusalem	Julietta	Juliett	James	Juliett	Juliett	JEW LEE ETT
K	King	Kilogramme	Kilo	Kilo	Kate	Kilo	Kilo	KEY LOH
L	Lewis	Liverpool	Lima	Lima	Louis	Lima	Lima	LEE MAH
M	Mary	Madagascar	Metro	Metro	Mary	Mike	Mike	MIKE
N	Nancy	New York	Nectar	Nectar	Nelly	November	November	NO VEM BER
O	Otto	Oslo	Oscar	Oscar	Oliver	Oscar	Oscar	OSS CUR
P	Peter	Paris	Polka	Papa	Peter	Papa	Papa	PAH PAH
Q	Queen	Quebec	Quebec	Quebec	Quaker	Quebec	Quebec	KEH BECK
R	Robert	Roma	Romeo	Romeo	Robert	Romeo	Romeo	ROW ME OH
S	Susan	Santiago	Sierra	Sierra	Samuel	Sierra	Sierra	SEE AIR RAH
T	Thomas	Tripoli	Tango	Tango	Thomas	Tango	Tango	TANG GO
U	Union	Upsala	Union	Union	Utah	Uniform	Uniform	YOU NEE FORM or OO NEE FORM
V	Victor	Valencia	Victor	Victor	Victor	Victor	Victor	VIK TAH
W	William	Washington	Whiskey	Whiskey	William	Whiskey	Whiskey	WISS KEY
X	X-ray	Xanthippe	eXtra	eXtra	X-Ray	X-ray	X-ray	ECKS RAY
Y	Young	Yokohama	Yankey	Yankee	Young	Yankee	Yankee	YANG KEY
Z	Zebra	Zurich	Zebra	Zulu	Zebra	Zulu	Zulu	ZOO LOO
0		Zero				Zero (proposal A: ZE-RO; proposal B: ZERO)	Nadazero	NAH-DAH-ZAY-ROH
1		One				One (proposal A: WUN; proposal B: WUN)	Unaone	OO-NAH-WUN
2		Two				Two (proposal A: TOO; proposal B: BIS)	Bissotwo	BEES-SOH-TOO
3		Three				Three (proposal A: TREE; proposal B: TER)	Terrathree	TAY-RAH-TREE
4		Four				Four (proposal A: FOW-ER; proposal B: QUARTO)	Kartefour	KAR-TAY-FOWER
5		Five				Five (proposal A: FIFE; proposal B: PENTA)	Pantafive	PAN-TAH-FIVE
6		Six				Six (proposal A: SIX; proposal B: SAXO)	Soxisix	SOK-SEE-SIX
7		Seven				Seven (proposal A: SEV-EN; proposal B: SETTE)	Setteseven	SAY-TAY-SEVEN
8		Eight				Eight (proposal A: AIT; proposal B: OCTO)	Oktoeight	OK-TOH-AIT
9		Nine				Nine (proposal A: NIN-ER; proposal B: NONA)	Novenine	NO-VAY-NINER
,		Comma				Comma		
/		Fraction bar				Fraction bar		Forward slash
		Break signal				Break signal		
.		Full stop (period)				Full stop (period)	Stop	STOP
.						Point (proposal A: DAY-SEE-MAL; proposal B: DECIMAL)	Decimal	DAY-SEE-MAL
Thousand						(Proposal A: TOUS-AND)		

For the 1938 and 1947 alphabets, each transmission of figures is preceded and followed by the words "as a number" spoken twice.

The ITU adopted the International Maritime Organization's phonetic spelling alphabet in 1959, and in 1969 specified that it be "for application in the maritime mobile service only".

During the late 1940s and early 1950s, there were two international aviation radio spelling alphabets, the "Able Baker" was used by most Western countries, while the "Ana Brazil" alphabet was used by South American and Caribbean regions.

Pronunciation was not defined prior to 1959. From 1959 to present, the underlined syllable of each code word for the letters should be stressed, and from 1969 to present, each syllable of the code words for the digits should be equally stressed, with the exceptions of the unstressed second syllables of fower, seven, niner, hundred.

=== ICAO Radiotelephone Spelling Alphabet ===
After WWII, the major work in producing a better spelling alphabet was conducted by the ICAO, which was subsequently adopted in modified form by the ITU and IMO. Its development is related to these various international conventions on radio, including:

- Universal Electrical Communications Union, Washington, D.C., December 1920
- International Radiotelegraph Convention, Washington, 1927 (which created the CCIR)
- General Radiocommunication and Additional Regulations (Madrid, 1932)
- Instructions for the International Telephone Service, 1932 (ITU-T E.141; withdrawn in 1993)
- The c. 1936 ARRL and 1928 Western Union alphabets likely originated earlier.
- General Radiocommunication Regulations and Additional Radiocommunication Regulations (Cairo, 1938)
- Radio Regulations and Additional Radio Regulations (Atlantic City, 1947), where "it was decided that the International Civil Aviation Organization and other international aeronautical organizations would assume the responsibility for procedures and regulations related to aeronautical communication. However, ITU would continue to maintain general procedures regarding distress signals."
- 1959 Administrative Radio Conference (Geneva, 1959)
- Final Acts of WARC-79 (Geneva, 1979). Here the alphabet was formally named "Phonetic Alphabet and Figure Code".
- International Code of Signals for Visual, Sound, and Radio Communications, United States Edition, 1969 (Revised 2003)
- NATO phonetic alphabet history
- International Telecommunication Union, Radio

The ICAO Radiotelephony Alphabet is defined by the International Civil Aviation Organization for international aircraft communications.

Symbol	1932 ITU/ICAN	1951 IATA	1956–Present ICAO
A	Amsterdam	Alfa	Alfa
B	Baltimore	Bravo	Bravo
C	Casablanca	Coca	Charlie
D	Denmark	Delta	Delta
E	Edison	Echo	Echo
F	Florida	Foxtrot	Foxtrot
G	Gallipoli	Golf	Golf
H	Havana	Hotel	Hotel
I	Italia	India	India
J	Jerusalem	Juliett	Juliett
K	Kilogramme	Kilo	Kilo
L	Liverpool	Lima	Lima
M	Madagascar	Mike	Mike
N	New York	November	November
O	Oslo	Oscar	Oscar
P	Paris	Papa	Papa
Q	Quebec	Quebec	Quebec
R	Roma	Romeo	Romeo
S	Santiago	Sierra	Sierra
T	Tripoli	Tango	Tango
U	Upsala	Uniform	Uniform
V	Valencia	Victor	Victor
W	Washington	Whiskey	Whisky
X	Xanthippe	X-ray	X-ray
Y	Yokohama	Yankee	Yankee
Z	Zurich	Zulu	Zulu
1			One (Wun)
2			Two
3			Tree
4			Fower
5			Fife
6			Six
7			Seven
8			Eight
9			Niner
0			Zero
-00			Hundred
-,000			Tousand
.			Decimal

=== Law enforcement ===
Defined by the Association of Public-Safety Communications Officials-International.

The APCO first suggested that its Procedure and Signals Committee work out a system for a "standard set of words representing the alphabet should be used by all stations" in its April 1940 newsletter.

Note: The old APCO alphabet has wide usage among Public Safety agencies nationwide, even though APCO itself deprecated the alphabet in 1974, replacing it with the ICAO spelling alphabet. See https://www.apcointl.org and APCO radiotelephony spelling alphabet.

Symbol	APCO Project 2 1967	APCO Project 14 (1974)
A	Adam	ALPHA
B	Boy	BRAVO
C	Charles	CHARLIE
D	David	DELTA
E	Edward	ECHO
F	Frank	FOXTROT
G	George	GOLF
H	Henry	HOTEL
I	Ida	INDIA
J	John	JULIETTE
K	King	KILO
L	Lincoln	LIMA
M	Mary	MIKE
N	Nora	NOVEMBER
O	Ocean	OSCAR
P	Paul	PAPA
Q	Queen	QUEBEC
R	Robert	ROMEO
S	Sam	SIERRA
T	Tom	TANGO
U	Union	UNIFORM
V	Victor	VICTOR
W	William	WHISKEY
X	X-ray	XRAY
Y	Young	YANKEE
Z	Zebra	ZULU
0	ZERO (with a strong Z and a short RO)	
1	WUN (with a strong W and N)	
2	TOO (with a strong and long OO)	
3	TH-R-EE (with a slightly rolling R and long EE)	
4	FO-WER (with a long O and strong W and final R	
5	VIE-YIV (with a long I changing to short and strong Y and V)	
6	SIKS (with a strong S and KS)	
7	SEV-VEN (with a strong S and V and well-sounded VEN)	
8	ATE (with a long A and strong T)	
9	NI-YEN (with a strong N at the beginning, a long I and a well sounded YEN)	

=== Amateur radio ===
The FCC regulations for Amateur radio state that "Use of a phonetic alphabet as an aid for correct station identification is encouraged" (47 C.F.R. § 97.119(b)(2)), but does not state which set of words should be used. Officially the same as used by ICAO, but there are significant variations commonly used by stations participating in HF contests and DX (especially in international HF communications).

The official ARRL alphabet changed over the years, sometimes to reflect the current norms, and sometimes by the force of law. In rules made effective beginning April 1, 1946, the FCC forbade using the names of cities, states, or countries in spelling alphabets.

Symbol	1930 ARRL List (same as 1918 Western Union)	1936–1946 ARRL	1946–1969 ARRL	1970–present ARRL (ICAO)	DX	DX alternate
A	Adams	Able	ADAM	Alpha	America	Amsterdam
B	Boston	Boy	BAKER	Bravo	Boston	Baltimore
C	Chicago	Cast	CHARLIE	Charlie	Canada	Chile
D	Denver	Dog	DAVID	Delta	Denmark	
E	Edward	Easy	EDWARD	Echo	England	Egypt
F	Frank	Fox	FRANK	Foxtrot	France	Finland
G	George	George	GEORGE	Golf	Germany	Geneva
H	Henry	Have	HENRY	Hotel	Honolulu	Hawaii
I	Ida	Item	IDA	India	Italy	Italy
J	John	Jig	JOHN	Juliett	Japan	
K	King	King	KING	Kilo	Kilowatt	Kentucky
L	Lincoln	Love	LEWIS	Lima	London	Luxembourg
M	Mary	Mike	MARY	Mike	Mexico	Montreal
N	New York	Nan	NANCY	November	Norway	Nicaragua
O	Ocean	Oboe	OTTO	Oscar	Ontario	Ocean
P	Peter	Pup	PETER	Papa	Pacific	Portugal
Q	Queen	Quack	QUEEN	Quebec	Quebec	Queen
R	Robert	Rot	ROBERT	Romeo	Radio	Romania
S	Sugar	Sail	SUSAN	Sierra	Santiago	Sweden
T	Thomas	Tare	THOMAS	Tango	Tokyo	Texas
U	Union	Unit	UNION	Uniform	United	Uruguay
V	Victor	Vice	VICTOR	Victor	Victoria	Venezuela
W	William	Watch	WILLIAM	Whiskey	Washington	
X	X-Ray	X-ray	X-RAY	X-ray	X-Ray	
Y	Young	Yoke	YOUNG	Yankee	Yokohama	
Z	Zero	Zed	ZEBRA	Zulu	Zanzibar	Zulu
1			One			
2			Two			
3			Tree			
4			Fower			
5			Fife			
6			Six			
7			Seven			
8			Eight			
9			Niner			
0			Zero			
.			Stop			
.			Decimal			

== Additions in other languages ==
Certain languages' standard alphabets have letters, or letters with diacritics (e.g., umlauts, rings, tildes), that do not exist in the English alphabet. If these letters have two-letter ASCII substitutes, the ICAO/ITU code words for the two letters are used.

=== Danish and Norwegian ===
In Danish and Norwegian the letters "æ", "ø" and "å" have their own code words. In Danish Ægir, Ødis and Åse represent the three letters, while in Norwegian the three code words are Ægir, Ørnulf and Ågot for civilians and Ærlig, Østen and Åse for military personnel.

=== Estonian ===
Estonian has four special letters, õ, ä, ö and ü. Õnne represents õ, Ärni for ä, Ööbik for ö and Ülle for ü.

=== Finnish ===
In Finnish there are special code words for the letters å, ä and ö. Åke is used to represent å, Äiti is used for ä and Öljy for ö. These code words are used only in national operations, the last remnants of the Finnish radio alphabet.

=== German ===
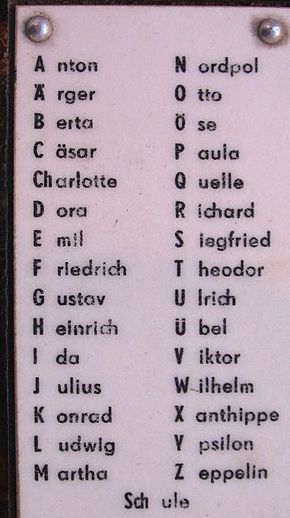
German alphabet used in Austria.

In German, Alfa-Echo (ae) may be used for "ä", Oscar-Echo (oe) for "ö", Sierra-Sierra (ss) for "ß", and Uniform-Echo (ue) for "ü".

=== Greek ===
The Greek spelling alphabet is a spelling alphabet for the Greek language, i.e. a set of names used in lieu of alphabet letters for the purpose of spelling out words. It is used by the Greek armed and emergency services.

=== Malay ===
Malay (including Indonesian) represents the letter "L" with "London", since the word lima means "five" in this language.

=== Russian ===
The Russian spelling alphabet is a spelling alphabet for the Russian version of the Cyrillic alphabet.

=== Spanish ===
In Spanish the word ñoño ([ˈɲo.ɲo], 'dull') is used for ñ.

=== Swedish ===
Åke is used for "å" Ärlig for "ä" and Östen for "ö" in the Swedish spelling alphabet, though the two-letter substitutes aa, ae and oe respectively may be used in absence of the specific letters.

== Table of spelling alphabets by language ==
Letters	NATO phonetic alphabet	French				German			Dutch / Flemish		Italian	Spanish	Portuguese		Scandinavian			Finnish	Turkish	Romanian	Czech	Yugoslav	Serbian	Slovene
Letters	(International)	(France)	(Belgium)	(Switzerland)	(Québec)	(Germany, 2022)	(Austria)	(Germany, informal, 2022) (Note: With DIN 5009 of June 2022, the German Institute for Standardisation has introduced a new spelling alphabet based on city names instead of first names. The system, which had been established for a good hundred years, had been slightly changed several times, including the replacement of Jewish names on a large scale by the Nazi regime in 1936, which was only partially corrected after the war. With the 2022 edition, DIN has largely reinstated the old first names from before 1936 and incorporated this alphabet, adjusted for Nazi interference, into the standard as an informal "postal spelling alphabet".)	(Netherlands)	(Belgium)	Italian	Spanish	(Brazil)	(Portugal)	Swedish	Danish	Norwegian	Finnish	Turkish	Romanian	Czech	Yugoslav	Serbian	Slovene
A	Alfa [sic]	Anatole	Arthur	Anna	Alice	Aachen	Anton	Albert	Anna/Anton	Arthur	Ancona	Antonio	Amor	Aveiro	Adam	Anna	Anna	Aarne	Adana	Ana	Adam	Avala	Avala	Ankaran
Å	-					Ringakzent Aachen		-							Åke	Åse	Åse	Åke	-					
Ä	-					Umlaut Aachen	Ärger	Änderung	-						Ärlig	-		Äiti	-					
Æ	-					Verbund Aachen Essen		-								Ægir	Ærlig	-						
B	Bravo	Berthe	Bruxelles	Berthe	Berthe	Berlin	Berta	Bernhard	Bern(h)ard	Brussel	Bologna	Burgos	Bandeira	Braga	Bertil	Bernhard	Bernhard	Bertta	Bolu	Barbu	Božena	Beograd	Beograd	Bled
C	Charlie	Célestin	César	Cécile	Charles	Chemnitz	Cäsar	Cäsar	Cornelis	Carolina	Como	Carmen	Cobra	Coimbra	Caesar	Cecilie	Caesar	Celsius	Ceyhan	Constantin	Cyril	Cetinje	Cetinje	Celje
Ç	-					Hakenstrich Chemnitz		-											Çanakkale	-				
Ch	-					-	Charlotte	Charlotte	-			Chocolate	-								Chrudim	-		
Č	-					Winkelakzent Chemnitz		-													Čeněk	Čačak	Čačak	Čatež
Ć	-					Aufwärtsakzent Chemnitz		-														Ćuprija	Ćuprija	-
D	Delta	Désiré	David	Daniel	David	Düsseldorf	Dora	David	Dirk	Desiré	Domodossola	David	Dado	Dafundo	David	David	David	Daavid	Denizli	Dumitru	David	Dubrovnik	Drina	Drava
DŽ	-																					džamija	Džep	-
Đ	-					Querstrich Düsseldorf		-														Đakovo	Đeravica	-
Ď	-																				Ďáblice	-		
E	Echo	Eugène	Émile	Émile	Édouard	Essen	Emil	Emil	Eduard	Emiel	Empoli	España	Estrela	Évora	Erik	Erik	Edith	Eemeli	Edirne	Elena	Emil	Evropa	Evropa	Evropa
F	Foxtrot	François	Frédéric	François	François	Frankfurt	Friedrich	Friedrich	Ferdinand	Frederik	Firenze	Francia	Feira	Faro	Filip	Frederik	Fredrik	Faarao	Fatsa	Florea	František	Foča	Futog	Fala
G	Golf	Gaston	Gustave	Gustave	George	Goslar	Gustav	Gustav	Gerard	Gustaaf	Genova	Granada	Goiaba	Guarda	Gustav	Georg	Gustav	Gideon	Giresun	Gheorghe	Gustav	Gorica	Golija	Gorica
Ğ	-					Bogenakzent Goslar		-											Yumuşak G (Note: This is simply the ordinary name of the letter.)	-				
H	Hotel	Henri				Hamburg	Heinrich	Heinrich	Hendrik	Hendrik	Hotel	Historia	Hotel	Horta	Helge	Hans	Harald	Heikki	Hatay	Haralambie	Helena	Hercegovina	Heroj	Hrastnik
I	India	Irma	Isidor	Ida	Isabelle	Ingelheim	Ida	Ida	Izaak	Isidoor	Imola	Inés	Índio	Itália	Ivar	Ida	Ivar	Iivari	Isparta	Ion	Ivan	Istra	Igalo	Izola
İ	-					Überpunkt Ingelheim		-											İzmir	-				
J	Juliett [sic]	Joseph	Joseph	Jeanne	Jacques	Jena	Julius	Jakob	Johan/Jacob /Julius	Jozef	Jolly, Juventus	José	José	José	Johan	Johan	Johan	Jussi	Jandarma	Jean	Josef	Jadran	Jadran	Jadran
K	Kilo	Kléber	Kilogramme	Kilo	Kilo	Köln	Kaufmann / Konrad	Katharina	Karel	Kilogram	Kappa, Kiwi	Kilo	Kiwi	Kodak	Kalle	Karen	Karin	Kalle	Kars	Kilogram	Karel	Kosovo	Kosovo	Kamnik
L	Lima	Louis	Léopold	Louise	Louis	Leipzig	Ludwig	Ludwig	Lodewijk/Leo	Leopold	Livorno	Lorenzo	Lua	Lisboa	Ludvig	Ludvig	Ludvig	Lauri	Lüleburgaz	Lazăr	Ludvik	Lika	Lovćen	Ljubljana
Ll	-											Llave	-											
LJ	-																					Ljubljana	Ljubovija	-
M	Mike	Marcel	Marie	Marie	Marie	München	Martha	Marie	Maria	Maria	Milano	Madrid	Maria	Maria	Martin	Mari	Martin	Matti	Muş	Maria	Marie	Mostar	Morava	Maribor
N	November	Nicolas	Napoléon	Nicolas	Nicolas	Nürnberg	Nordpol	Nathan	Nico	Napoleon	Napoli	Navidad	Navio	Nazaré	Niklas	Nikolaj	Nils	Niilo	Niğde	Nicolae	Norbert	Niš	Niš	Nanos
Ñ	-					Tilde Nürnberg		-				Ñoño	-											
NJ	-																					Njegoš	Njegoš	-
Ň	-																				Nina	-		
O	Oscar	Oscar	Oscar	Olga	Olivier	Offenbach	Otto	Otto	Otto	Oscar	Otranto	Oviedo	Ouro	Ovar	Olof	Odin	Olivia	Otto	Ordu	Olga	Oto (Otakar)	Osijek	Obilić	Ormož
Ö	-					Umlaut Offenbach	Ökonom / Österreich / Öse	Ökonom	-						Östen	-		Öljy	Ödemiş	-				
Ø	-					Schräggestrichen Offenbach		-								Øresund	Østen	-						
P	Papa	Pierre	Piano	Paul	Pierre	Potsdam	Paula	Paula	Pieter	Piano	Padova	París	Pipa	Porto	Petter	Peter	Petter	Paavo	Polatlı	Petre	Petr	Pirot	Pirot	Piran
Q	Quebec	Quintal	Quiévrain	Quittance	Québec	Quickborn	Quelle	Quelle	Quirinus/Quinten /Quotiënt	Quotiënt	Quadro	Queso	Quilombo	Queluz	Quintus	Quintus	Quintus	Kuu	-	Qu (Chiu)	Quido	kvadrat	Ku	Queen
R	Romeo	Raoul	Robert	Robert	Robert	Rostock	Richard	Richard	Richard/Rudolf	Robert	Roma	Ramón	Raiz	Rossio	Rudolf	Rasmus	Rikard	Risto	Rize	Radu	Rudolf	Rijeka	Ruma	Ravne
Ř	-																				Řehoř	-		
S	Sierra	Suzanne	Simon	Suzanne	Samuel	Salzwedel	Samuel / Siegfried	Samuel	Simon	Sofie	Savona	Sábado	Saci	Setúbal	Sigurd	Søren	Sigrid	Sakari	Sinop	Sandu	Svatopluk	Skopje	Sava	Soča
Ş	-					Hakenstrich Salzwedel		-											Şırnak	-				
Sch	-					-	Schule	Schule	-															
ß	-					Eszett	Eszett / scharfes S	Eszett	-															
Š	-					Winkelakzent Salzwedel		-													Šimon	Šibenik	Šabac	Šmarje
T	Tango	Thérèse	Téléphone	Thérèse	Thomas	Tübingen	Theodor	Theodor	Theodor	Telefoon	Torino	Toledo	Tatu	Tavira	Tore	Theodor	Teodor	Tyyne	Tokat	Tudor	Tomáš	Tuzla	Timok	Triglav
Ť	-																				Těšnov	-		
U	Uniform	Ursule	Ursule	Ulysse	Ursule	Unna	Ulrich	Ulrich	Utrecht	Ursula	Udine	Ulises	Uva	Unidade	Urban	Ulla	Ulrik	Urho	Uşak	Udrea	Urban	Užice	Užice	Unec
Ü	-					Umlaut Unna	Übermut / Übel	Überfluss	-						Übel	-			Ünye	-				
V	Victor	Victor				Völklingen	Viktor	Viktor	Victor	Victor	Verona, Venezia	Valencia	Vitória	Vidago	Viktor	Viggo	Enkelt-V	Vihtori	Van	Vasile	Václav	Valjevo	Valjevo	Velenje
W	Whiskey	William	Waterloo	William	William	Wuppertal	Wilhelm	Wilhelm	Willem	Waterloo	Whiskey, Washington	Washington	Wilson	Waldemar	Wilhelm	William	Dobbelt-W	Wiski	-	dublu v	dvojité V	duplo ve	Duplo ve	Dvojni v
X	X-ray	Xavier	Xantippe	Xavier	Xavier	Xanten	Xanthippe / Xaver	Xanthippe	Xant(h)ippe	Xavier	Ics, Xilofono	Xilófono	Xadrez	Xavier	Xerxes	Xerxes	Xerxes	Äksä	-	Xenia	Xaver	iks	Iks	Iks
Y	Yankee	Yvonne				Ypsilon	Ypsilon	Ypsilon	Ypsilon	Yvonne	York, yogurt	Yolanda	Yolanda	York	Yngve	Yrsa	Yngling	Yrjö	Yozgat	I grec	Ypsilon	ipsilon	Ipsilon	Ipsilon
Ÿ/IJ	-					Verbund Ingelheim Jena		-	IJmuiden (Ÿmuiden) / IJsbrand (Ÿsbrand)	-														
Z	Zulu	Zoé	Zéro	Zurich	Zoé	Zwickau	Zacharias / Zürich	Zacharias	Zaandam/Zacharias	Zola	Zara, Zorro	Zaragoza	Zebra	Zulmira	Zäta	Zackarias	Zakarias	Tseta	Zonguldak	Zahăr	Zuzana	Zagreb	Zemun	Zalog
Ž	-					Winkelakzent Zwickau		-													Žofie	Žirovnica	Žabljak	Žalec

=== Other alphabets ===
The PGP word list, the Bubble Babble wordlist used by ssh-keygen, and the S/KEY dictionary, are spelling alphabets for public key fingerprints (or other binary data) – a set of names given to data bytes for the purpose of spelling out binary data in a clear and unambiguous way via a voice channel.

Many unofficial spelling alphabets are in use that are not based on a standard, but are based on words the transmitter can remember easily, including first names, states, or cities. The LAPD phonetic alphabet has many first names. The German spelling alphabet ("Deutsches Funkalphabet" (literally "German Radio Alphabet")) also uses first names. Also, during the Vietnam war, soldiers used 'Cain' instead of 'Charlie' because 'Charlie' meant Viet Cong (Charlie being short for Victor Charlie, the International alphabet spelling of the initials VC).

== See also ==
- NATO phonetic alphabet
- Allied Military Phonetic Spelling Alphabet
- APCO radiotelephony spelling alphabet
- Language-specific spelling alphabets
  - Greek spelling alphabet
  - German spelling alphabet
  - Dutch spelling alphabet
  - Russian spelling alphabet
  - Swedish Armed Forces' radio alphabet
  - Japanese radiotelephony alphabet
  - Korean spelling alphabet
- Cockney alphabet
