= DIN 5009 =

DIN standard defining the German spelling alphabet

The German national standard DIN 5009 “Word and information processing for office applications — Announcing and dictating of text and characters” by Deutsches Institut für Normung (DIN) provides rules for the spoken announcement of texts to be written afterwards. In addition to the classic phono dictation, it specifically supports oral communication about names and texts that have to be written down correctly (e.g. on the telephone).

It also specifies German names for numerous script and special characters, which are important not only for oral communication but also for written teaching material. These are mostly listed in a supplement which was published together with the 2022 edition of the standard.

The standard contains the German spelling alphabet. As the former version was criticized for the changes made by the Nazis in 1934, who purged all names which sound “Jewish”, and as these were restored only partially in the 1950 version, in 2019 the responsible DIN committee decided to create a new spelling alphabet consisting mainly of city names instead of person names, which has been published in the 2022 version of the standard.

== Table ==
Letter	Code word (1983)	Code word (2022)
A	Anton	Aachen
Ä	Ärger	Umlaut Aachen
B	Berta	Berlin
C	Cäsar	Chemnitz
Ch	Charlotte	-
D	Dora	Düsseldorf
E	Emil	Essen
F	Friedrich	Frankfurt
G	Gustav	Goslar
H	Heinrich	Hamburg
I	Ida	Ingelheim
J	Julius	Jena
K	Kaufmann	Köln
L	Ludwig	Leipzig
M	Martha	München
N	Nordpol	Nürnberg
O	Otto	Offenbach
Ö	Ökonom	Umlaut Offenbach
P	Paula	Potsdam
Q	Quelle	Quickborn
R	Richard	Rostock
S	Samuel	Salzwedel
Sch	Schule	-
ẞ	Eszett	Eszett
T	Theodor	Tübingen
U	Ulrich	Unna
Ü	Übermut	Umlaut Unna
V	Viktor	Völklingen
W	Wilhelm	Wuppertal
X	Xanthippe	Xanten
Y	Ypsilon	Ypsilon
Z	Zacharias	Zwickau

== Revisions ==
- DIN 5009:1983-06
- DIN 5009:1996-12
- DIN 5009:2022-06
