= Swedish Armed Forces radio alphabet =

Radiotelephony alphabet

The Swedish Armed Forces' radio alphabet was a radiotelephony alphabet made up of Swedish two-syllable male names with the exception of Z which is just the name of the letter as pronounced in Swedish.

The Swedish Armed Forces are since 2006 instructed to use the NATO alphabet instead of the original Swedish alphabet, along with and adaptation of the NATO voice procedures to communicate, since most activity is in various international UN and NATO missions. This has been changed back again since the administrative authorities are required to use the Swedish language according to Swedish law even the Swedish Armed Forces.

The alphabet is also used for civil communications in Sweden, one example being local flights operating under VFR.

Letter	Word	Pronunciation
A	Adam	
B	Bertil	
C	Cesar	
D	David	
E	Erik	
F	Filip	[ˈfilip]
G	Gustav	
H	Helge	
I	Ivar	
J	Johan	[ˈjʊan]
K	Kalle	[²kalɛ]
L	Ludvig	
M	Martin	
N	Niklas	
O	Olof	[²uːlɔf], [ˈuːlɔf]
P	Petter	
Q	Qvintus	
R	Rudolf	
S	Sigurd	
T	Tore	
U	Urban	
V	Viktor	
W	Wilhelm	
X	Xerxes	[ˈksɛ̌rksɛs]
Y	Yngve	
Z	Zäta	[ˈsɛːta]
Å	Åke	[ˈoːˌkɛ]
Ä	Ärlig	[ˈæːˌɭɪɡ]
Ö	Östen	

Digit	Word	Pronunciation
1	Ett	[ɛt]
2	Tvåa	
3	Trea	
4	Fyra	[ˈfyːˌra]
5	Femma	
6	Sexa	
7	Sju	[ɧʉː]
8	Åtta	[ˈɔtːa]
9	Nia	
0	Nolla	

Symbol	Word	Pronunciation
Decimal point	Komma	[²kɔma]
Ü	Über	
