= Korean spelling alphabet =

Spelling alphabet

The Korean spelling alphabet (Korean: 한국어 표준 음성 기호; also 한글 통화표) is a spelling alphabet for the Korean language, similar to the NATO phonetic alphabet.

== The alphabet ==
Consonants

Letter	Spelling alphabet
ㄱ	Korean: 기러기; RR: gireogi
ㄴ	나폴리; Napolli
ㄷ	도라지; doraji
ㄹ	로마; Roma
ㅁ	미나리; minari
ㅂ	바가지; bagaji
ㅅ	서울; Seoul
ㅇ	잉어; ingeo
ㅈ	지게; jige
ㅊ	치마; chima
ㅋ	키다리; kidari
ㅌ	통신; tongsin
ㅍ	파고다; pagoda
ㅎ	한강; Hangang

Vowels

Letter	Spelling alphabet
ㅏ	아버지; abeoji
ㅑ	야자수; yajasu
ㅓ	어머니; eomeoni
ㅕ	연못; yeonmot
ㅗ	오징어; ojingeo
ㅛ	요지경; yojigyeong
ㅜ	우편; upyeon
ㅠ	유달산; Yudalsan
ㅡ	은방울; eunbangul
ㅣ	이순신; I Sunsin
ㅐ	앵무새; aengmusae
ㅔ	엑스레이; ekseurei

Numbers

Digit	Spelling alphabet
1	하나; hana
2	둘; dul
3	삼; sam
4	넷; net
5	오; o
6	여섯; yeoseot
7	칠; chil
8	팔; pal
9	아홉; ahop
0	공; gong

== Sources ==
- "무선국의 운용 등에 관한 규정: 별표 1: 무선통신에 사용하는 모르스부호·약어 및 통화표(제4조관련)" (in Korean). Korea Ministry of Government Legislation. 2016-06-23.
