= Russian spelling alphabet =

Phonetic alphabet for Cyrillic letters

The Russian spelling alphabet at right (PDF)

The Russian spelling alphabet is a spelling alphabet (or "phonetic alphabet") for Russian, i.e. a set of names given to the alphabet letters for the purpose of unambiguous verbal spelling. It is used primarily by the Russian army, navy and the police. The large majority of the identifiers are common individual first names, with a handful of ordinary nouns and grammatical identifiers also. A good portion of the letters also have an accepted alternative name. This Alphabet was also standardized by all Soviet Warsaw Pact members and was also used by domestic maritime traffic, emergency services, civilian domestic aviation and the Soviet airforce.

== Alphabet ==
The letter words are as follows:

Letter	Name	Pronunciation	Romanization/Translation	Accepted variant	Pronunciation	Romanization/Translation
А	Анна	[ˈanːə]	Anna	Антон	[ɐnˈton]	Anton
Б	Борис	[bɐˈrʲis]	Boris			
В	Василий	[vɐˈsʲilʲɪj]	Vasily			
Г	Григорий	[ɡrʲɪˈɡorʲɪj]	Gregory	Галина	[ɡɐˈlʲinə]	Galina
Д	Дмитрий	[ˈdmʲitrʲɪj]	Dmitri			
Е	Елена	[jɪˈlʲɛnə]	Yelena			
Ё	Елена	[jɪˈlʲɛnə]	Yelena	Ёлка	[ˈjolkə]	Yolka ('spruce')
Ж	Женя	[ˈʐenʲə]	Zhenya ('Gene')	жук	[ˈʐuk]	zhuk ('beetle')
З	Зинаида	[zʲɪnɐˈidə]	Zinaida	Зоя	[ˈzojə]	Zoya
И	Иван	[ɪˈvan]	Ivan			
Й	Иван краткий	[ɪˈvan ˈkratkʲɪj]	Ivan kratkiy ('short Ivan')	йот	[ˈjot]	yot ('jot')
К	Константин	[kənstɐnʲˈtʲin]	Konstantin	киловатт	[kʲɪlɐˈvat]	kilovatt ('kilowatt')
Л	Леонид	[lʲɪɐˈnʲit]	Leonid			
М	Михаил	[mʲɪxɐˈil]	Mikhail	Мария	[mɐˈrʲijə]	Mariya
Н	Николай	[nʲɪkɐˈlaj]	Nikolai			
О	Ольга	[ˈolʲɡə]	Olga			
П	Павел	[ˈpavʲɪl]	Pavel			
Р	Роман	[rɐˈman]	Roman	радио	[ˈradʲɪo]	radio ('radio')
С	Семён	[sʲɪˈmʲɵn]	Semyon ('Simon')	Сергей	[sʲɪˈrɡʲej]	Sergei
Т	Татьяна	[tɐˈtʲjanə]	Tatyana	Тамара	[tɐˈmarə]	Tamara
У	Ульяна	[ʊˈlʲjanə]	Ulyana			
Ф	Фёдор	[ˈfʲɵdər]	Fyodor			
Х	Харитон	[xərʲɪˈton]	Khariton			
Ц	цапля	[ˈtsaplʲə]	tsaplya ('heron')	центр	[ˈtsɛntr]	tsentr ('center')
Ч	человек	[tɕɪlɐˈvʲɛk]	chelovek ('human')			
Ш	Шура	[ˈʂurə]	Shura			
Щ	щука	[ˈɕːukə]	shchuka ('pike')			
Ъ	твёрдый знак	[ˈtvʲɵrdɨj znak]	tvyordiy znak ('hard sign')			
Ы	еры	[jɪˈrɨ]	yery ('old name for the letter Ы')	игрек	[ˈiɡrʲɪk]	i grik ('Greek I', from the French Y)
Ь	мягкий знак	[ˈmʲæxʲkʲɪj znak]	myagkiy znak ('soft sign')	знак	[ˈznak]	znak ('sign')
Э	эхо	[ˈɛxə]	ekho ('echo')	Эмма	[ˈɛmə]	Emma
Ю	Юрий	[ˈjʉrʲɪj]	Yuri			
Я	Яков	[ˈjakəf]	Yakov			

== Numbers ==
Number	Name	Transliteration	Translation	Distinguish from
50	полсотни	polsotni	'half-hundred'	60
50	полста	polsta	'half-hundred'	60
12	дюжина	dyuzhina	'dozen'	13

== See also ==
- ICAO spelling alphabet, for Roman letters
- Greek spelling alphabet

== Sources ==
- Yuri Baltin. "Russkij Kod Bukva-Slovo (Русский код буква-слово)" (in Russian).
