= Association of Public-Safety Communications Officials-International =

Organization

Association of Public-Safety Communications Officials International
- Abbreviation: APCO
- Established: 1935
- Headquarters: Daytona Beach, Florida
- Website: www.apcointl.org

Association of Public-Safety Communications Officials (APCO) International was founded in 1935.

APCO serves government functions that provide public safety communications services in areas of law enforcement, forestry, conservation, fire, highway maintenance, emergency rescue and medical services, emergency management, and other activities supported or endorsed by federal, state, local and tribal governments. The primary purposes of the association are to:

1. Foster the development and progress of public safety communications and supporting information technologies.
2. Promote rapid and accurate collection, exchange and dissemination of information relating to emergencies and other vital public safety communications;
3. Represent its members, public safety communications and supporting information technological interests in general before regulatory and policy-making bodies as may be appropriate; and
4. Strive to protect citizens and their property and provide for their welfare by these and other appropriate means.

== Events ==
APCO International hosts several events and conferences each year.

The Annual Conference and Expo, held every year beginning in 1935, brings together public safety telecommunicators, vendors, instructors and industry leaders. More than 5,000 people attended APCO 2014 in New Orleans, LA.

The Emerging Technology Forum offered twice a year, is a two-day event for public safety communications professionals who want an overview of technologies that are on the horizon.

The Public Safety Broadband Summit, held annually, provides a forum for technology experts, policy leaders, industry partners, wireless service providers, and public safety professionals to discuss timely issues affecting the deployment of the FirstNet nationwide public safety broadband network.

The Public Safety Communications Leadership in Policy Awards Dinner annually recognizes the leaders in public safety communications who have continued to advocate for the industry.

National Public Safety Telecommunicators Week, the second whole week in April, honors the telecommunications personnel in the public safety community.

== Standards ==
APCO International is an American National Standards Institute (ANSI)-accredited Standards Developer (ASD). APCO's 16 active standards include operational and training standards for telecommunicators, supervisors, instructors, training officers, communications center managers and directors, as well as technical standards in areas such as alarm systems and common incident types for data exchange.

== Training and certification ==
APCO Institute offers onsite training, online education, and continuing education, from frontline basic training to supervisory courses. It also provides operational support products, such as EMD guide cards and the APCO IntelliComm Guidecard & Software Systems supported by IBM Watson Analytics.

The APCO Agency Training Program Certification is a formal mechanism for public safety agencies to certify their training programs as meeting APCO ANS 3.103.1-2010: Minimum Training Standards for Public Safety Telecommunicators. This standard specifies the minimum training requirements of call takers and dispatchers of law enforcement, fire services, and emergency medical services assigned to the public safety telecommunicator function.

The APCO Registered Public-Safety Leader Program is a 12-month online program, available to APCO members, leading to the professional designation of Registered Public-Safety Leader (RPL). Students are taught to communicate with authority, build and manage high-performance teams, break down barriers to solid interpersonal negotiations, enhance team performance, and lead with confidence and integrity.

The APCO Certified Public-Safety Executive Program consists of two 12-week online courses and one nine-day capstone course at APCO headquarters in Daytona Beach, Florida, open to graduates of the RPL program or those with an associate degree who aspire to lead public safety organizations. Graduates of the program earn the professional designation of Certified Public-Safety Executive (CPE).

== Programs ==
AFC, APCO's spectrum management arm, provides radio frequency management for public safety agencies, from frequency coordination to licensing services and management to engineering tools and interference complaints.

The Project RETAINS Toolkit & Effective Practices Guide assists communications center managers, HR personnel, police and fire chiefs, and others in addressing the challenges of hiring and retaining qualified personnel.

APCO's Government Relations Office (GRO) establishes and maintains relationships with Congress, federal agencies, the Administration, industry leaders, and national public safety and governmental organizations to advocate for the policies, regulations, and legislation of most importance to APCO members.

AppComm is an online collection of applications related to public safety and emergency response, for use by the general public and first responders. Public safety professionals, the general public, and app developers can discuss and rate apps, identify unmet needs, and submit ideas for apps they would like to see built.

NJTI Telecommunicator Emergency Response Taskforce (TERT) is a partnership between APCO and NENA that assists individual states in developing programs that would lead to the establishment of trained teams of individuals who can be mobilized quickly and deployed to assist communications centers during disasters.

Public Safety Communications magazine is an official APCO publication for emergency communications center personnel that includes features on comm center operations, regulatory issues, and technical topics; analysis of new procedures, technology and products; association and industry news; and commentary.

In addition, APCO's Comm Center and 9-1-1 Services department provide resources and research on a wide array of topics, including 9-1-1 public outreach, advanced automatic crash notification (AACN) and vehicular emergency data set (VEDS), automated secure alarm protocol (ASAP), computer-assisted dispatch (CAD), human resources for professional communications, next-generation communications systems, FirstNet, wireless location accuracy and more.

== Foundation ==
The Public Safety Foundation of America (PSFA), a 501(c)(3) charitable organization, was established in January 2002 by the Association of Public-Safety Communications Officials International (APCO). The PSFA's objective is to provide critical funding and technical support to public safety answering points (PSAPs) and local emergency response officials.

APCO has developed several industry standards that bear its name. For example, APCO-16, APCO-25, and the APCO phonetic alphabet are all widely used.

== See also ==
- 9-1-1
- American National Standards Institute
- Computer-aided dispatch
- Dispatcher
- Emergency medical dispatcher
- FirstNet
- Next generation 911
- Public safety
