= Greek spelling alphabet =

Names for Greek letters to aid spelling

The Greek spelling alphabet is a spelling alphabet (or "phonetic alphabet") for Greek, i.e. an accepted set of easily differentiated names given to the letters of the alphabet for the purpose of spelling out words. It is used mostly on radio voice channels by the Greek army, the navy and the police. The names for some Greek letters are easily confused in noisy conditions. The names of Alpha, Beta, and Delta are not used, to prevent clashes with the NATO phonetic alphabet which uses their names to refer to the latin script letters A, B, and D.

Similar sounding Greek letters:

- víta (β), zíta (ζ), íta (η), thíta (θ)
- épsilon (ε), ýpsilon (υ)
- mi (μ), ni (ν)
- xi (ξ), pi (π), fi (φ), chi (χ), psi (ψ)

== The spelling alphabet ==
Letter	Greek name	English name	spelling name	transliteration and translation
Α, α	álfa	alpha	αστήρ	astír ('star')
Β, β	víta	beta	Βύρων	Víron ('Byron')
Γ, γ	gámma	gamma	γαλή	galí ('cat')
Δ, δ	délta	delta	δόξα	dóxa ('glory')
Ε, ε	épsilon	epsilon	Ερμής	Ermís ('Hermes')
Ζ, ζ	zíta	zeta	Ζευς	Zefs ('Zeus')
Η, η	íta	eta	Ηρώ	Iró ('Hero')
Θ, θ	thíta	theta	θεά	theá ('goddess')
Ι, ι	ióta	iota	ίσκιος	ískios ('shadow')
Κ, κ	káppa	kappa	κενόν	kenón ('blank')
Λ, λ	lámbda	lambda	λάμα	láma ('blade')
Μ, μ	mi	mu	μέλι	méli ('honey')
Ν, ν	ni	nu	ναός	naós ('church')
Ξ, ξ	xi	xi	Ξέρξης	Xérxis ('Xerxes')
Ο, ο	ómikron	omicron	οσμή	osmí ('smell')
Π, π	pi	pi	Πέτρος	Pétros ('Peter')
Ρ, ρ	ro	rho	ρήγας	rígas ('king')
Σ, σ, -ς	sígma	sigma	σοφός	sofós ('wise')
Τ, τ	taf	tau	τίγρης	tígris ('tiger')
Υ, υ	ípsilon	upsilon	ύμνος	ímnos ('hymn')
Φ, φ	fi	phi	Φωφώ	Fofó (female diminutive name)
Χ, χ	chi	chi	χαρά	chará ('joy')
Ψ, ψ	psi	psi	ψυχή	psichí ('soul')
Ω, ω	oméga	omega	ωμέγα	oméga

== See also ==
- NATO/ICAO phonetic alphabet, for the Roman alphabet
- Russian spelling alphabet
