= Cockney Alphabet =

Parody recital of the English alphabet

The Cockney Alphabet is a recital of the English alphabet intended to parody the way the alphabet is taught to small working class children. The ostensible humour comes from forming unexpected words and phrases from the names of the various letters of the alphabet, mocking the way working class Londoners are supposed to speak. Cockney is a name sometimes given to Londoners born within the sound of "Bow Bells" (St Mary-Le-Bow church in Cheapside, City of London).

== Clapham and Dwyer version ==
"A Surrealist Alphabet"

Song by Clapham and Dwyer
- A-side: "A Spot of Fishing"
- Released: 1936
- Genre: Comedy
- Label: Columbia
- Songwriters: Clapham and Dwyer

In 1936, the comedy double act Clapham and Dwyer recorded the following version, entitled "A Surrealist Alphabet":

A for 'orses (hay for horses)
B for mutton (beef or mutton)
C for 'th highlanders (Seaforth Highlanders)
D for 'ential (deferential)
E for Adam (Eve or Adam)
F for 'vescence (effervescence)
G for police (chief of police)
H for respect (age for respect)
I for Novello (Ivor Novello)
J for oranges (Jaffa oranges)
K for 'ancis, (Kay Francis)
L for leather (Hell for leather)
M for 'sis (emphasis)
N for 'adig (in for a dig, or infra dig.)
O for the garden wall (over the garden wall)
P for a penny (pee for a penny)
Q for a song (cue for a song), or Q for billiards (cue for billiards)
R for mo' (half a mo')
S for you (it's for you)
T for two (tea for two)
U for films (UFA films)
V for La France (vive la France)
W for a bob (double you for a bob?, as in gambling)
X for breakfast (eggs for breakfast)
Y for Gawd's sake (why, for God's sake?)
Z for breezes (zephyr breezes, see West wind)
