= Radiotelephony procedure =

Techniques to clarify communications over two-way radios

Radiotelephony procedure (also on-air protocol and voice procedure) includes various techniques used to clarify, simplify and standardize spoken communications over two-way radios, in use by the armed forces, in civil aviation, police and fire dispatching systems, citizens' band radio (CB), and amateur radio.

Voice procedure communications are intended to maximize clarity of spoken communication and reduce errors in the verbal message by use of an accepted nomenclature. It consists of a signalling protocol such as the use of abbreviated codes like the CB radio ten-code, Q codes in amateur radio and aviation, police codes, etc., and jargon.

Some elements of voice procedure are understood across many applications, but significant variations exist. The armed forces of the NATO countries have similar procedures in order to make cooperation easier.

The impacts of having radio operators who are not well-trained in standard procedures can cause significant operational problems and delays, as exemplified by one case of amateur radio operators during Hurricane Katrina, in which:

...many of the operators who were deployed had excellent go-kits and technical ability, but were seriously wanting in traffic handling skill. In one case it took almost 15 minutes to pass one 25 word message.

== Introduction ==
Radiotelephony procedures encompass international regulations, official procedures, technical standards, and commonly understood conventions intended to ensure efficient, reliable, and inter-operable communications via all modes of radio communications. The most well-developed and public procedures are contained in the Combined Communications Electronics Board's Allied Communications Procedure ACP 125(G): Communications Instructions Radiotelephone Procedures.

These procedures consist of many different components. The three most important ones are:

1. Voice procedures—what to say
2. Speech technique—how to say it
3. Microphone technique—how to say it into a microphone

These procedures have been developed, tested under the most difficult of conditions, then revised to implement the lessons learned, many times since the early 1900s. According to ACP 125(G) and the Virginia Defense Force Signal Operating Instructions:

Voice procedure is designed to provide the fastest and most accurate method of speech transmission. All messages should be pre-planned, brief and straightforward. Ideally, messages should be written down: even brief notes reduce the risk of error. Messages should be constructed clearly and logically in order not to confuse the recipient.

Voice procedure is necessary because:

1. Speech on a congested voice net must be clear, concise and unambiguous. To avoid interference between speech and data, it will often be expedient to assign the passage of data traffic to logistic or admin nets rather than to those directly associated with command and control.
2. It must be assumed that all transmissions will be intercepted by a portion of the civilian population. The use of a standard procedure will help reduce the threat of spreading rumors or creating panic among those not involved in an emergency response.
3. Some form of discipline is needed to ensure that transmissions do not overlap. If two people send traffic at the same time, the result is chaos.

Radio operators must talk differently because two-way radios reduce the quality of human speech in such a way that it becomes harder to understand. A large part of the radio-specific procedures is the specialized language that has been refined over more than 100 years.

There are several main methods of communication over radio, and they should be used in this order of preference:

1. Procedure words
2. Standard (predefined) phraseology (for most things in aviation and maritime use)
3. Plain language dialogue (for things that can't be handled by phraseology)
4. Formal messages
5. Narrative messages
6. Dialogue (normal conversation)
7. Brevity codes, including Ten-codes, and Phillips Code; and operating signals, including 92 code, Q code, and Z code; should be used as a last choice, as these lists of codes are so extensive that it is unlikely that all participants have the full and correct definitions memorized. All of those listed here except the ten-code are designed exclusively for use in Morse code or teletypewriter use, and are thus unsuitable for use on voice circuits.

== International Radio Regulations ==
All radio communications on the planet operate under regulations created by the ITU-R, which prescribes most of the basic voice radio procedures, and these are further codified by each individual country.

=== United States radio regulations ===
In the U.S., radio communications are regulated by the NTIA and the FCC. Regulations created by the FCC are codified in Title 47 of the Code of Federal Regulations:

- Part 4—Disruptions to Communications
- Part 20—Commercial Mobile Services
- Part 80—Stations in the Maritime Services (Maritime Mobile Service)
- Part 87—Aviation Services
- Part 90—Private Land Mobile Radio Services (Concerning licensed wireless communications for businesses and non-federal governments)
  - Subpart C—Business Band
- Part 95—Personal Radio Services (MURS, FRS, GMRS, and CB radio)
- Part 97—Amateur Radio Service (Ham radio)
- Part 300—NTIA Rules and Regulations

== Radio call signs ==
Radio call signs are a globally unique identifier assigned to all stations that are required to obtain a licence in order to emit RF energy. The identifiers consist of from 3 to 9 letters and digits, and while the basic format of the call signs are specified by the ITU-R Radio Regulations, Article 19, Identification of stations, the details are left up to each country's radio licensing organizations.

=== Official call signs ===
Each country is assigned a range of prefixes, and the radiotelecommunications agencies within each country then responsible for allocating call signs, within the format defined by the RR, as they see fit. The Radio Regulations require most radio stations to regularly identify themselves by means of their official station call sign or other unique identifier.

=== Functional designators ===
Because official radio call signs have no inherent meaning outside of the above-described patterns, and other than individually licensed Amateur radio stations, do not serve to identify the person using the radio, they are not usually desirable as the primary means of identifying which person, department, or function is transmitting or is being contacted.

For this reason, functional designators (a.k.a. tactical call signs) are frequently used to provide such identification. Such designators are not sufficient to meet the FCC requirements that stations regularly identify the licence they are operating under, typically every x number of minutes and at the end of each transmission, where x ranges from 10 to 30 minutes (longer for broadcast stations).

For some radio services, the FCC authorizes alternate station IDs, typically in situations where the alternate station ID serves the purposes of identifying the transmitting station better than the standard ITU format. These include:

- Aircraft—the registration number (tail number) of the aircraft, preceded by the type (typical of general aviation aircraft); or the aircraft operator nickname assigned by the FAA, followed by the flight number (typical of scheduled airline services).
- Land mobile—Name of the station licensee (typically abbreviated), location of station, name of city, or facility served, followed by additional digits following the more general ID.
- Land mobile railroad—Name of railroad, followed by the train number, engine number etc.

=== Call signs in the United States ===
The United States has been assigned all call signs with the prefixes K, N, and W, as well as AAA–ALZ. Allocating call signs within these groups is the responsibility of the National Telecommunications and Information Administration (almost all government stations) or the Federal Communications Commission (all other stations), and they subdivide the radio call signs into the following groups:

==== Military call sign systems ====
- AAA–AEZ and ALA–ALZ are reserved for Department of the Army stations
- AFA–AKZ are assigned to the Department of the Air Force
- NAA–NZZ is jointly assigned to the Department of the Navy and the U.S. Coast Guard.

==== Amateur call sign systems ====
Ham station call signs begin with A, K, N or W, and have a single digit from 0 to 9 that separates the 1 or 2 letter prefix from the 1 to 3 letter suffix (special event stations have only three characters: the prefix, the digit, and a one-letter suffix).

==== Maritime call signs ====
Maritime call signs have a much more complex structure, and are sometimes replaced with the name of the vessel or a Maritime Mobile Service Identity (MMSI) number.

== Microphone technique ==
The IARU Emergency Telecommunications Guide offers a set of guidelines for microphone technique, with the goal of avoiding heavy voice distortion.

U.S. military radio procedures recommend headsets with noise-cancelling microphones.

The U.S. Navy radio operator training manual NAVPERS 10228-B, Radioman 3 & 2 training course (1957 edition), advises the user on how to hold their microphone, and how to speak in a way that makes the transmission intelligible.

The California Statewide EMS Operations and Communications Resource manual also provides guidance on proper technique, suggesting that the user should limit the length of their transmissions.

== Speech technique ==
Communicating by voice over two-way radios is more difficult than talking with other people face-to-face or over the telephone. The human voice is changed dramatically by two-way radio circuits. In addition to cutting off important audio bandwidth at both the low and high ends of the human speech spectrum (reducing the bandwidth by at least half), other distortions of the voice occur in the microphone, transmitter, receiver, and speaker—and the radio signal itself is subject to fading, interruptions, and other interference. All of these make human speech more difficult to recognize; in particular, momentary disruptions or distortions of the signal are likely to block the transmission of entire syllables.

The best way to overcome these problems is by greatly reducing the number of single-syllable words used. This is very much counter to the human nature of taking shortcuts, and so takes training, discipline, and having all operators using the same language, techniques, and procedures.

=== Method of speech ===
Several radio operation procedures manuals, including ACP 125(G) teach the same mnemonic of Rhythm, Speed, Volume, and Pitch (RSVP):

Rhythm
Use short sentences divided into sensible phrases which maintain a natural rhythm; they should not be spoken word by word. Where pauses occur, the press-to-talk should be released to minimize transmission time and permit stations to break in when necessary.
Speed
Speak slightly slower than for normal conversation. Where a message is to be written down by the recipients, or in difficult conditions, extra time should be allowed to compensate for the receiving station experiencing the worst conditions. Speed of transmission is easily adjusted by increasing or decreasing the length of pauses between phrases, as opposed to altering the gaps between words; the latter will create an unnatural, halted style of speech, which is difficult to understand.
Volume
Speak quietly when using whisper facilities, otherwise the volume should be as for normal conversation. Shouting causes distortion.
Pitch
The voice should be pitched slightly higher than for normal conversation to improve clarity.

According to the UK's Radiotelephony Manual, CAP 413, radio operators should talk at a speed of fewer than 100 words per minute.

== Radio discipline ==
Communicating over a half-duplex, shared circuit with multiple parties requires a large amount of discipline in following the established procedures and conventions, because whenever one particular radio operator is transmitting, that operator can not hear any other station on the channel being used.

=== ABC—Accuracy, Brevity, Clarity ===
The initialism ABC is commonly used as a memory aid to reinforce the three most important rules about what to transmit.

=== The Five Ws ===
Whenever a report or a request is transmitted over a two-way radio, the operator should consider including the standard Five Ws in the transmission, so as to eliminate additional requests for information that may occur and thereby delay the request (and other communications).

1. Who—needs something
2. What—do they need
3. Why—do they need it
4. When—do they need it
5. Where—do they need it

=== Other practices ===
Local practices may emphasise different parts of generally known procedures for different contexts. Here are two examples.

The Jamaica Amateur Radio Association outlines these practices as part of voice procedure and radio discipline, among others:

- "Think before you speak"
- "Listen before you speak"
- "Answer all calls promptly"
- "Keep the airways free of unnecessary talk"
- "Be brief and to the point"

In Texas, the Harris County Amateur Radio Emergency Service suggest 33 good practice procedures specific to emergencies, for example:

- "Only transmit facts"
- "Do not act as a relay station unless Net Control, or another radio station, asks for a relay - and then only if you are certain you can fulfill the requirements with your station."

== Voice procedures ==
The procedures described in this section can be viewed as the base of all voice radio communications procedures.

=== Service-specific procedures ===
However, the international aviation and maritime industries, because their global expansion in the 20th century coincided with, and were heavily integral to the development of voice procedures and other aspects in the development of two-way radio technology, gradually developed their own variations on these procedures.

==== Aeronautical Mobile Service ====
Voice communications procedures for international air traffic control and communications among aircraft are defined by the following International Civil Aviation Organization documents:

- Annex 10—Aeronautical Telecommunications, Volume II—Communications Procedures including those with PANS status,
- Procedures for Air Navigation Services—Air Traffic Management (PANS-ATM, ICAO Doc 4444)
- ICAO Doc 9432 (AN/925) Manual of Radiotelephony.

Refinements and localization of these procedures can be done by each member country of ICAO.

- United States
  - FAA Pilot Controller Glossary
- United Kingdom
  - Civil Aviation Authority's Radiotelephony manual

==== Maritime Mobile Service ====
Voice procedures for use on ships and boats are defined by the International Telecommunication Union and the International Maritime Organization bodies of the United Nations, and by international treaties such as the Safety of Life at Sea Convention (a.k.a. SOLAS 74), and by other documents, such as the International Code of Signals.

- ITU Radio Regulations
  - Appendix 18
- ITU maritime recommendations
  - ITU-R M.1171: Radiotelephony procedures in the maritime mobile service.
- IMO resolutions
  - Resolution A.918(22) (covers Standard Marine Communication Phrases)

==== Police procedures ====
In the U.S., the organization chartered with devising police communications procedures is APCO International, the Association of Police Communications Officers, which was founded in 1935. For the most part, APCO's procedures have been developed independently of the worldwide standard operating procedures, leading to most police departments using a different spelling alphabet, and the reverse order of calling procedure (e.g. 1-Adam-12 calling Dispatch).

However, APCO occasionally follows the international procedure standards, having adopted the U.S. Navy's Morse code procedure signs in the 1930s, and adopting the ICAO radiotelephony spelling alphabet in 1974, replacing its own Adam-Boy-Charles alphabet adopted in 1940, although very few U.S. police departments made the change.

APCO has also specified Standard Description Forms, a standard order of reporting information describing people and vehicles.

===== Standard description of persons =====
The Standard Description of Persons format first appeared in the April 1950 edition of the APCO Bulletin. It starts with a description of the person themself and finishes with a description of what they are wearing at the time.

Standard Description of Persons Form
| Start | Finish |
|---|---|
| 1. Name; 2. Colour; 3. Sex; 4. Age; 5. Height; 6. Weight; 7. Hair; 8. Eyes; 9. Complexion; 10. Physical | 11. Clothing Head to Foot; 1. Hat; 2. Shirt or Tie; 3. Coat; 4. Trousers; 5. Socks; 6. Shoes |

===== Standard description of automobiles =====
APCO promotes the mnemonic CYMBALS for reporting vehicle descriptions:

APCO vehicle description format
| Property | Example |
|---|---|
| Colour | Red |
| Year | 2001 |
| Make | Ford |
| Body | F-150 |
| Additional descriptive items | With a black camper shell |
| Licence | 1234567 |
| State | California |

=== Calling procedure ===
The voice calling procedure (sometimes referred to as "method of calling" or "communications order model") is the standardized method of establishing communications. The order of transmitting the called station's call sign, followed by the calling station's call sign, was first specified for voice communications in the International Radiotelegraph Convention of Washington, 1927, however it matches the order used for the radiotelegraph calling procedure that had already existed since at least 1912. In the United States, the radiotelegraph calling procedure is legally defined in FCC regulations Part 80.97 (47 CFR 80.97(c)), which specifies that the method of calling begins with the call sign of the station called, not more than twice, [THIS IS] and the call sign of the calling station, not more than twice". This order is also specified by the ICAO for international aviation radio procedures (Annex 10 to the Convention on. International Civil Aviation: Aeronautical Telecommunications.), the FAA (Aeronautical Information Manual) and by the ITU-R for the Maritime Mobile Service (ITU-R M.1171), and the U.S. Coast Guard (Radiotelephone Handbook). The March, 1940 issue of The APCO Bulletin explains the origin of this order was found to have better results than other methods,

1. MUST give the callsign of the station you are calling, twice (never three times)
2. MUST follow the callsign with the proword THIS IS
3. MUST give your callsign once, and once only
4. Communicate
5. SHOULD end your transmission with the proword OVER, or OUT, although this can be omitted when using a repeater that inserts a courtesy tone at the end of each transmission.

=== Break-in procedure ===
Stations needing to interrupt other communications in-progress shall use the most appropriate of the below procedure words, followed by their call sign.

The use of these emergency signals is governed by the International Radio Regulations that have the force of law in most countries, and were originally defined in the International Code of Signals and the International Convention for the Safety of Life at Sea, so the rules for their use emanate from that document.

All of these break-in procedure words must be followed by your call sign, because that information will help the NCS determine the relevant importance when dealing with multiple break-ins of the same precedence, and to determine the relevance when multiple calls offering a CORRECTION or INFO are received.

| Priority | Proword | Signal Type | Use For | Handling | Prosign/OPSIG |
|---|---|---|---|---|---|
| 1 | FLASH | Message precedence | Events that are a grave threat to the nation or a region | FLASH messages are to be handled as fast as humanly possible, ahead of all other messages, with in-station handling time not to exceed 10 minutes. U.S. Government use only per CFR 47. FLASH messages are handled before all three types of international priority signals, including MAYDAY. | Z |
| 2 | MAYDAY; MAYDAY; MAYDAY | International priority signals | Lives or property are in danger | Immediate! All radio traffic not actively engaged in assisting the station in distress stops or moves to another frequency. This rule applies on all frequencies allocated to emergency use. On other frequencies, the rule is modified to allow FLASH precedence traffic, because FLASH messages have a similar scope of immediate danger (especially when it is a military communication) and also need immediate responses. | S̅O̅S̅ S̅O̅S̅ S̅O̅S̅ |
| 3 | PAN-PAN; PAN-PAN; PAN-PAN | International priority signals | Urgent situations that are not life-threatening | Immediate, unless there is an ongoing Mayday issue. This is considered to be IMMEDIATE precedence traffic. If the condition is medical, use PAN-PAN MEDICAL, PAN-PAN MEDICAL, PAN-PAN MEDICAL. | XXX XXX XXX |
| 4 | SÉCURITÉ; SÉCURITÉ; SÉCURITÉ | International priority signals | Important safety information | Immediate, unless there is an ongoing Mayday or Pan-pan issue. Must be sent as T T T instead of TTT in order to differentiate it from the Morse code symbol for O. This is considered to be IMMEDIATE precedence traffic. | TTT TTT TTT |
| 5 | IMMEDIATE | Message precedence | Handling within 30 minutes | IMMEDIATE messages are processed, transmitted, and delivered in the order received and ahead of all messages of lower precedence. They are to be handled as quickly as possible, with in-station handling time not to exceed 30 minutes. | O |
| 6 | PRIORITY | Message precedence | Handling within 3 hours | PRIORITY precedence messages are processed, transmitted, and delivered in the order received and ahead of all messages of ROUTINE precedence. They are to be handled as quickly as possible, with in-station handling time not to exceed 3 hours. | P |
| 7 | ROUTINE | Message precedence | Handling by the next day | Used for all types of message traffic justifying transmission by rapid means, but not of sufficient urgency to require higher precedence. They should be handled as soon as traffic flow allows, but no later than the beginning of the next duty day. | R |
| 8 | CORRECTION | Message handling | Providing a correction to another station | Use to let the Net Control Station know you have a correction for something that the NCS or another station transmitted. | E̅E̅E̅E̅E̅E̅E̅E̅ |
| 9 | INFO | Message handling | Providing an answer to another station | Use to let the NCS know that you have information relating to a topic or question transmitted by the NCS or another station. | INFO |

=== Order of priority of communications ===
The priority levels described below are derived from Article 44 of the ITU Radio Regulations, Chapter VIII, and were codified as early as the International Telecommunication Convention, Atlantic City, 1947 (but probably existed much earlier).

Radiotelephony communications priority
| Order of priority | Simplify calling procedure | Radiotelephony signal | Radiotelegraph signal |
|---|---|---|---|
| 1 | Distress calls, distress messages, and distress traffic | MAYDAY | S̅O̅S̅ |
| 2 | Urgency messages, including messages preceded by the medical transports signal. | PAN, PAN or PAN, PAN MEDICAL | XXX |
| 3 | Communications relating to direction finding | | QSH, QTF |
| 4 | Safety information | SÉCURITÉ | TTT |
| 5 | Meteorological messages | | QFA, QFZ, QNY, QUB, QMW, QMX, QMZ |
| 6 | Flight regularity (navigation and safe movement) messages | | QAB, QBI, QBV, QBX, QCA, QDV, QFM, QGQ, QHG, |
| 7 | Messages relative to the navigation, movements, and needs of ships | | Most Q signals in the QOA–QQZ range |
| 8 | Government messages for which priority right has been claimed. | | |
| 9 | Service messages relating to the working of the radiocommunication service or to radiotelegrams previously transmitted | SERVICE | Messages prefixed with SVC |
| 10 | All other communications | | |

=== Procedure words ===
Procedure words are a direct voice replacement for procedure signs (prosigns) and operating signals (such as Q codes), and must always be used on radiotelephone channels in their place. Prosigns/operating signals may only be used with Morse Code (as well as semaphore flags, light signals, etc.) and TTY (including all forms of landline and radio teletype, and Amateur radio digital interactive modes). The most complete set of procedure words is defined in the U.S. Military's Allied Communications Publication ACP 125(G).

Procedure words for general use
| Proword | Explanation | Prosign/ OPSIG |
| THIS IS | This transmission is from the station whose designator immediately follows. | DE |
| UNKNOWN STATION | The identity of the station with whom I am attempting to establish communication is unknown. | A̅A̅ |
| NOTHING HEARD | To be used when no reply is received from a call station. | ZGN (military) NIL (civilian) |
| ROGER | This is a method of receipt. I have received your last transmission satisfactorily. This usage comes from the Morse code prosign "R", which means "received": from 1943 to early 1956, the code word for R was Roger in the Allied Military phonetic spelling alphabets in use by the armed forces, including the Joint Army/Navy Phonetic Alphabet and RAF phonetic alphabet. This use was officially continued even after the spelling word for R was changed to ROMEO. Contrary to popular belief, Roger does not mean or imply both "received" and "I will comply." That distinction goes to the contraction wilco (from "will comply"), which is used exclusively if the speaker intends to say "received and will comply". The phrase "Roger Wilco" is procedurally incorrect, as it is redundant with respect to the intent to say "received". | R |
| OVER | This is the end of my transmission to you and a response is necessary. Go ahead, transmit | K |
| WILCO | I HAVE RECEIVED YOUR SIGNAL, UNDERSTAND IT, AND WILL COMPLY. To be used only by the addressee. Since the meaning of ROGER is included in that of WILCO, the two prowords are never used together. | |
| OUT | This is the end of my transmission to you and no answer is required or expected. | A̅R̅ |
| CQ | General call to all stations | CQ |
| OUT TO YOU | This is the end of my transmission to you. I am about to call (or resume a call) with other station(s). | A̅R̅ |
| WAIT | I must pause for a few seconds | A̅S̅ |
| WAIT – OUT | I must pause for longer than a few seconds. | A̅S̅ A̅R̅ |
| FIGURES | Numerals or numbers follow. | n/a |
| I SPELL | I shall spell the next word phonetically. | n/a |
| SPEAK SLOWER | Your transmission is too fast. Reduce speed of transmission. | QRS |
| WORD AFTER | The word of the message to which I have reference is that which follows.............. | WA |
| WORD BEFORE | The word of the message to which I have reference is that which precedes.............. | WB |
| ALL AFTER | The portion of the message to which I have reference is all that follows............... | AA |
| ALL BEFORE | The portion of the message to which I have reference is all that precedes.............. | AB |
| SAY AGAIN | Repeat all of your last transmission. Followed by identification data means "Repeat………… (portion indicated)." | I̅M̅I̅? |
| I SAY AGAIN | I am repeating transmission or portion indicated. | I̅M̅I̅ |
| CORRECTION | An error has been made in this transmission. Transmission will continue with the last word correctly transmitted. An error has been made in this transmission (or message indicated). The correct version is...... That which follows is a corrected version in answer to your request for verification" | E̅E̅E̅E̅E̅E̅E̅E̅C C |
| CORRECT | You are correct, or what you have transmitted is correct.. Because AFFIRMATIVE could be confused with NEGATIVE, always use CORRECT instead of YES or AFFIRMATIVE. | C |
| NEGATIVE | No, or negative. | ZUG (military) N (civilian) |
| WRONG | Your last transmission was incorrect. The correct version is....... | ZWF |
| DISREGARD THIS TRANSMISSION – OUT | This transmission is in error, disregard it. (This proword shall not be used to cancel any message that has been completely transmitted and receipted.) | E̅E̅E̅E̅E̅E̅E̅E̅ A̅R̅ |
| REQUEST TIME CHECK | I am requesting an accurate time check. | I̅N̅T̅ ZUA (military) QTR I̅M̅I̅ (civilian) |
| TIME CHECK | I am about to confirm the exact time | |
| TIME | The time I am transmitting is exact as at the moment I said TIME | ZUA (military) QTR (civilian) |
| INTERCO | International Code of Signals groups follow (spoken IN-TER-CO) | INTERCO |

=== Radio checks ===
Whenever an operator is transmitting and uncertain of how good their radio and/or voice signal are, they can use the following procedure words to ask for a signal strength and readability report. This is the modern method of signal reporting that replaced the old 1 to 5 scale reports for the two aspects of a radio signal, and as with the procedure words, are defined in ACP 125(G):

The prowords listed below are for use when initiating and answering queries concerning signal strength and readability.

| Proword | Meaning |
|---|---|
| RADIO CHECK | What is my signal strength and readability? |
| ROGER | I have received your last transmission satisfactorily. |
| NOTHING HEARD | To be used when no reply is received from a called station. |

==== Signal strength prowords ====
In the tables below, the mappings of the QSA and QRK Morse code prosigns is interpreted because there is not a 1:1 correlation. See QSA and QRK code for the full procedure specification.

| Proword | Meaning | Prosign/OPSIG |
|---|---|---|
| LOUD | Your signal is very strong. | QSA5 |
| GOOD | Your signal strength is good. | QSA4 |
| WEAK | Your signal strength is weak. | QSA3 |
| VERY WEAK | Your signal strength is very weak. | QSA2 |
| FADING | At times your signal strength fades to such an extent that continuous reception cannot be relied upon. | QSA1 or QSB |

==== Readability prowords ====
| Proword | Meaning | Prosign/OPSIG |
|---|---|---|
| CLEAR | The quality of your transmission is excellent. | QRK5 |
| READABLE | The quality of your transmission is satisfactory. | QRK4 |
| DISTORTED | Having trouble reading you due to distortion. | QRK3 |
| WITH INTERFERENCE | Having trouble reading you due to interference. | QRK3 |
| INTERMITTENT | Having trouble reading you because your signal is intermittent. | QRK2 |
| UNREADABLE | The quality of your transmission is so bad that I cannot read you. | QRK1 |

The reporting format is one of the signal strength prowords followed by an appropriate conjunction, with that followed by one of the readability prowords:

LOUD AND CLEAR means Excellent copy with no noise

GOOD AND READABLE means Good copy with slight noise

FAIR BUT READABLE means Fair copy, occasional fills are needed

WEAK WITH INTERFERENCE means Weak copy, frequent fills are needed because of interference from other radio signals.

WEAK AND UNREADABLE means Unable to copy, a relay is required

According to military usage, if the response would be LOUD AND CLEAR, you may also respond simply with the proword ROGER. However, because this reporting format is not currently used widely outside of military organizations, it is better to always use the full format, so that there is no doubt about the response by parties unfamiliar with minimization and other shorthand radio operating procedures.

=== International Radiotelephony Spelling Alphabet ===
The International Civil Aviation Organization (ICAO), International Telecommunication Union, and the International Maritime Organization (all agencies of the United Nations), plus NATO, all specify the use of the ICAO Radiotelephony Spelling Alphabet for use when it is necessary to spell out words, callsigns, and other letter/number sequences. It was developed with international cooperation and ratified in 1956, and has been in use unmodified ever since.

==== Rules for spelling ====
Spelling is necessary when difficult radio conditions prevent the reception of an obscure word, or of a word or group, which is unpronounceable. Such words or groups within the text of plain language messages may be spelt using the phonetic alphabet; they are preceded by the proword "I SPELL". If the word is pronounceable and it is advantageous to do so, then it should be spoken before and after the spelling to help identify the word.

==== Rules for numbers and figures ====
When radio conditions are satisfactory and confusion will not arise, numbers in the text of a message may be spoken as in normal speech. During difficult conditions, or when extra care is necessary to avoid misunderstanding, numbers are sent figure by figure preceded by the proword FIGURES. This proword warns that figures follow immediately, to help distinguish them from other similarly pronounced words.

| Letter | Code word |
|---|---|
| A | Alfa |
| B | Bravo |
| C | Charlie |
| D | Delta |
| E | Echo |
| F | Foxtrot |
| G | Golf |
| H | Hotel |
| I | India |
| J | Juliett |
| K | Kilo |
| L | Lima |
| M | Mike |
| N | November |
| O | Oscar |
| P | Papa |
| Q | Quebec |
| R | Romeo |
| S | Sierra |
| T | Tango |
| U | Uniform |
| V | Victor |
| W | Whiskey |
| X | X-ray |
| Y | Yankee |
| Z | Zulu |

ACP 121(I) and ACP 125(G) Punctuation
| Character | Code word | ICAO and ITU | Abbreviated as |
|---|---|---|---|
| . | Full Stop / period | Full stop | PD |
| , | Comma | Comma | CMM |
| / | Slant/oblique | Slant | Slant |
| - | Hyphen | Hyphen | Hyphen |
| ( | Left-hand bracket | Brackets on | Paren |
| ) | Right-hand bracket | Brackets off | Unparen |
| : | Colon | Colon | CLN |
| ; | Semi-colon | Semi-colon | SMCLN |
| ? | Question mark | Question mark | Ques |
| " | Open quote | Quote | Quote |
| " | Close quote | Unquote | Unquote |
| . | Decimal | Decimal | Point |

=== Closing down ===
Ending a two-way radio call has its own set of procedures:

- Generally, the station that originated the call is the station that should initiate termination of the call.
- All stations indicate their last transmission of a particular communication exchange by using the proword OUT (I intend no further communication with you at this time) or OUT TO YOU (I am ending my communication with you and calling another station).
- Stations going off the air (specifically turning their radio equipment off or leaving the station unattended) can additionally state that they are "closing" or "closing down", based on the proword command "CLOSE DOWN".

== Radio nets ==
Nets operate either on schedule or continuously (continuous watch). Nets operating on schedule handle traffic only at definite, prearranged times and in accordance with a prearranged schedule of intercommunication. Nets operating continuously are prepared to handle traffic at any time; they maintain operators on duty at all stations in the net at all times. When practicable, messages relating to schedules will be transmitted by a means of signal communication other than radio.

=== Net manager ===
A net manager is the person who supervises the creation and operation of a net over multiple sessions. This person will specify the format, date, time, participants, and the net control script. The net manager will also choose the Net Control Station for each net, and may occasionally take on that function, especially in smaller organizations.

=== Net Control Station ===
Radio nets are like conference calls in that both have a moderator who initiates the group communication, who ensures all participants follow the standard procedures, and who determines and directs when each other station may talk. The moderator in a radio net is called the Net Control Station, formally abbreviated NCS, and has the following duties:

- Establishes the net and closes the net;
- Directs Net activities, such as passing traffic, to maintain optimum efficiency;
- Chooses net frequency, maintains circuit discipline and frequency accuracy;
- Maintains a net log and records participation in the net and movement of messages; (always knows who is on and off net)
- Appoints one or more Alternate Net Control Stations (ANCS);
- Determines whether and when to conduct network continuity checks;
- Determines when full procedure and full call signs may enhance communications;
- Subject to Net Manager guidance, directs a net to be directed or free.

The Net Control Station will, for each net, appoint at least one Alternate Net Control Station, formally abbreviated ANCS (abbreviated NC2 in WWII procedures), who has the following duties:

- Assists the NCS to maintain optimum efficiency;
- Assumes NCS duties in event that the NCS develops station problems;
- Assumes NCS duties for a portion of the net, as directed or as needed;
- Serves as a resource for the NCS; echoes transmissions of the NCS if, and only if, directed to do so by the NCS;
- Maintains a duplicate net log

=== Structure of the net ===
Nets can be described as always having a net opening and a net closing, with a roll call normally following the net opening, itself followed by regular net business, which may include announcements, official business, and message passing. Military nets will follow a very abbreviated and opaque version of the structure outlined below, but will still have the critical elements of opening, roll call, late check-ins, and closing.

A net operates on the same principle as the inverted pyramid used in journalism, the most important communications always come first, followed by content in ever lower levels of priority.

1. Net opening
  1. Identification of the NCS
  2. Announcement of the regular date, time, and frequency of the net
  3. Purpose of the net
2. Roll call
  1. A call for stations to check in, oftentimes from a roster of regular stations
  2. A call for late check-ins (stations on the roster who did not respond to the first check-in period)
  3. A call for guest stations to check in
3. Net business
4. Optional conversion to a free net
5. Net closing

Each net will typically have a main purpose, which varies according to the organization conducting the net, which occurs during the net business phase. For amateur radio nets, it's typically for the purpose of allowing stations to discuss their recent operating activities (stations worked, antennas built, etc.) or to swap equipment. For Military Auxiliary Radio System and National Traffic System nets, net business will involve mainly the passing of formal messages, known as radiograms.

=== Time synchronization procedures ===
Stations without the ability to acquire a time signal accurate to at least one second should request a time check at the start of every shift, or once a day minimum. Stations may ask the NCS for a time check by waiting for an appropriate pause, keying up and stating your call sign, and then using the prowords "REQUEST TIME CHECK, OVER" when the NCS calls on you. Otherwise, you may ask any station that has access to any of the above time signals for a time check.

Once requested, the sending station will state the current UTC time plus one minute, followed by a countdown as follows:

This is Net Control, TIME CHECK WUN AIT ZERO TOO ZULU (pause) WUN FIFE SECONDS…WUN ZERO SECONDS…FIFE FOWER TREE TOO WUN…TIME WUN AIT ZERO TOO ZULU…OVER

The receiving station will then use the proword "TIME" as the synch mark, indicating zero seconds. If the local time is desired instead of UTC, substitute the time zone code "JULIETT" for "ZULU".

Instead of providing time checks on an individual basis, the NCS should give advance notice of a time check by stating, for example, "TIME CHECK AT 0900 JULIETT", giving all stations sufficient time to prepare their clocks and watches for adjustment. A period of at least five minutes is suggested.

=== Modes of radio net operation ===
- Directed Net
  - A net in which no station other than the net control station can communicate with any other station, except for the transmission of urgent messages, without first obtaining the permission of the net control station.
- Free net
  - A net in which any station may communicate with any other station in the same net without first obtaining permission from the net control station to do so.

=== Types of net calls ===
When calling stations who are part of a net, a variety of types of calls can be used:

| Call type | Includes | Usage |
|---|---|---|
| Single call | The call sign of a single station | Used to call a particular station, inviting them, and giving them permission to communicate with NCS |
| Multiple call | A list of two or more individual call signs | Used to request that two or more stations take some action. |
| Collective call | A call to the entire net | An invitation and permission for all stations to check in. The form of a net call on non-military nets. |
| Limited collective call | A call to a portion of the net | A call to a specific subset of the net participants, which may take one of the following forms: All stations with emergency traffic or priority message traffic; All stations with message traffic; All stations with long-distance (e.g. out-of-state) message traffic; All stations with a call sign suffix in a specified range (common in Amateur radio nets); All stations in a geographic region |
| Net call | The call sign of the net | A specific form of a collective call, used mainly in military nets, to indicate that the NCS is calling all stations. The first use of this is a very abbreviated form of requesting stations to check-in to the net. |
| Exempt call | Multiple stations | A collective call where one or more stations are not required (or not even permitted) to respond, based on prior arrangement. A common feature in military net procedures. |
| Selcall | One or multiple stations | An automatic method of selectively calling other stations, using DTMF codes or other signalling. On military radios, a selcall will typically cause all radios the selcall was addressed to provide an audible or visual alert, decreasing the odds that any particular operator will miss the call. |

=== Types of radio nets ===
The Civil Air Patrol and International Amateur Radio Union define a number of different nets which represent the typical type and range used in civilian radio communications:

| Type | Usage |
|---|---|
| Command and Control (C2) Nets | For conveying messages and information between different locations and levels of command. This is where formal messages are exchanged, so it serves the same purpose as an IARU Traffic net. |
| Tactical Net | A Tactical Net is established whenever a requirement exists to coordinate the actions of deployed units in a mobile or portable environment. The primary purpose is to support deployed units, and it would generally be conducted from an Incident Command Post |
| Liaison Nets | Anytime the host of the net is involved with other agencies. |
| Contingency Nets | Communications managers at each level have the authority to initiate stand-by nets, placing radio stations within their span of control on alert to be available for developing conditions that may result in event activity. |
| Training Net | Communication managers may establish nets for training purposes, such as to teach radio procedures to novice operators, or new skills and procedures to more advanced operators. |
| Resource net | Used for incoming operators to receive assignments, and to be reassigned as needs changed. Can also be used to locate equipment and operators with special skills. More than one resource net may be created in large-scale events if the traffic warrants. |
| Logistics net | A type of resource net specifically tasked with logistical needs separate from those of the communications teams. |
| Tactical net | Handle the primary on-site emergency communication. |
| Information net | Used to disseminate official bulletins, answer general questions, etc. |
| Traffic net | Handles formal written messages (radiograms) |
| Health and Welfare (H&W) net | A Traffic Net that handles messages among those people impacted by or in the vicinity of a disaster and their friends and family living outside the disaster zone. These nets usually handle messages between concerned friends, families and persons within and outside of the disaster area where legally permitted. In Amateur radio, these nets are conducted with the National Traffic System and exchange ARRL Radiograms. |
| Maritime broadcast communications net | A radio net used by boats when in distress or assisting another vessel in distress. |

=== Radio net procedure words ===
U.S. Army Field Manual ACP 125(G) has the most complete set of procedure words used in radio nets:

| Proword | Explanation | Prosign/ OPSIG |
|---|---|---|
| NET NOW | All stations are to net their radios on the unmodulated carrier wave which I am about to transmit. | ZRC2 |
| THIS IS A DIRECTED NET | From now until further notice this net is directed. | ZKB |
| THIS IS A FREE NET | From now until further notice this net is free. | ZUG ZKB |
| BROADCAST YOUR NET | Link the two nets under your control for automatic rebroadcast | |
| STOP BROADCASTING | Cut the automatic link between the two nets that are being rebroadcast and revert to normal working. | |
| REBROADCAST YOUR NET | Commence automatic rebroadcasting of your other net onto this frequency | |
| STOP REBROADCASTING | Cease rebroadcasting your other net onto this frequency | QRT |
| ASSUME CONTROL | You will assume control of this net until further notice | ZKD |
| I AM ASSUMING CONTROL | I am assuming control of this net until further notice | ZKA |
| REPORTING INTO THE NET | Calling station is joining an established net or returning after having been closed down. | |
| REPORT STRENGTH AND READABILITY | Report to me how you are receiving all other stations on the net | |
| ANSWER AFTER | The station called is to answer after call sign........when answering transmissions. | ZGO |
| USE ABBREVIATED CALL SIGNS | Call signs are to be abbreviated until further notice. | |
| USE FULL CALL SIGNS | Call signs are to be sent in full until further notice. | |
| USE ABBREVIATED PROCEDURE | As conditions are normal, all stations are to use abbreviated procedure until further notice. | |
| USE FULL PROCEDURE | As conditions are not normal, all stations are to use full procedure until further notice. | |
| SILENCE (Repeated three or more times) | Cease transmissions on this net immediately. Silence will be maintained until lifted. (Transmissions must be authenticated by use of a self authenticated system, codeword, etc.) | H̅M̅ H̅M̅ H̅M̅ |
| SILENCE LIFTED | Silence is lifted. (Transmissions must be authenticated by means of self authentication system, codeword, etc.) | ZUG H̅M̅ H̅M̅ H̅M̅ |
| CLOSE DOWN | Stations are to close down when indicated. Acknowledgments are required | ZKJ |

== Example usage ==
=== Aeronautical mobile procedure ===
The Federal Aviation Administration uses the term phraseology to describe voice procedure or communications protocols used over telecommunications circuits. An example is air traffic control radio communications. Standardised wording is used and the person receiving the message may repeat critical parts of the message back to the sender. This is especially true of safety-critical messages. Consider this example of an exchange between a controller and an aircraft:

Aircraft: Boston Tower, Warrior three five foxtrot (35F), holding short of two two right.
Tower: Warrior three five foxtrot, Boston Tower, runway two two right, cleared for immediate takeoff.
Aircraft: Roger, cleared for immediate takeoff, two two right, Warrior three five foxtrot.

On telecommunications circuits, disambiguation is a critical function of voice procedure. Due to any number of variables, including radio static, a busy or loud environment, or similarity in the phonetics of different words, a critical piece of information can be misheard or misunderstood; for instance, a pilot being ordered to eleven thousand as opposed to seven thousand (by hearing "even"). To reduce ambiguity, critical information may be broken down and read as separate letters and numbers. To avoid error or misunderstanding, pilots will often read back altitudes in the tens of thousands using both separate numbers and the single word (example: given a climb to 10,000 ft, the pilot replies "[Callsign] climbing to One zero, Ten Thousand"). However, this is usually only used to differentiate between 10,000 and 11,000 ft since these are the most common altitude deviations. The runway number read visually as eighteen, when read over a voice circuit as part of an instruction, becomes one eight. In some cases a spelling alphabet is used (also called a radio alphabet or a phonetic alphabet). Instead of the letters AB, the words Alpha Bravo are used. Main Street becomes Mike Alpha India November street, clearly separating it from Drain Street and Wayne Street. The numbers 5 and 9 are pronounced "fife" and "niner" respectively, since "five" and "nine" can sound the same over the radio. The use of 'niner' in place of 'nine' is due to German-speaking NATO allies for whom the spoken word 'nine' could be confused with the German word 'nein' or 'no'.

Over fire service radios, phraseology may include words that indicate the priority of a message, for example:

Forty Four Truck to the Bronx, Urgent!

or

San Diego, Engine Forty, Emergency traffic!

Words may be repeated to modify them from traditional use in order to describe a critical message:

Evacuate! Evacuate! Evacuate!

A similar technique may be used in aviation for critical messages. For example, this transmission might be sent to an aircraft that has just landed and has not yet cleared the runway.

Echo-Foxtrot-Charlie, Tower. I have engine out traffic on short final. Exit runway at next taxiway. Expedite! Expedite!

Police Radios also use this technique to escalate a call that is quickly becoming an emergency.

Code 3! Code 3! Code 3!

Railroads have similar processes. When instructions are read to a locomotive engineer, they are preceded by the train or locomotive number, direction of travel and the engineer's name. This reduces the possibility that a set of instructions will be acted on by the wrong locomotive engineer:

Five Sixty Six West, Engineer Jones, okay to proceed two blocks west to Ravendale.

Phraseology on telecommunications circuits may employ special phrases like ten codes, Sigalert, Quick Alert! or road service towing abbreviations such as T6. This jargon may abbreviate critical data and alert listeners by identifying the priority of a message. It may also reduce errors caused by ambiguities involving rhyming, or similar-sounding, words.

=== Maritime mobile procedure ===
(Done on VHF Ch 16)

Boat "Albacore" talking to Boat "Bronwyn"

Albacore: Bronwyn, Bronwyn, Bronwyn* this is Albacore, OVER. (*3×1, repeating the receiver's callsign up to 3 times, and the sender's once, is proper procedure and should be used when first establishing contact, especially over a long distance. A 1×1, i.e. 'Bronwyn this is Albacore,' or 2×1, i.e. 'Bronwyn, Bronwyn, this is Albacore,' is less proper, but acceptable especially for a subsequent contact.)

Bronwyn: Albacore, this is Bronwyn, OVER. (** At this point switch to a working channel as 16 is for distress and hailing only**)

Albacore: This is Albacore. Want a tow and are you OK for tea at Osbourne Bay? OVER.

Bronwyn: This is Bronwyn. Negative, got engine running, 1600 at clubhouse fine with us. OVER.

Albacore: This is Albacore, ROGER, OUT.

"Copy that" is incorrect. COPY is used when a message has been intercepted by another station, i.e. a third station would respond:

Nonesuch: Bronwyn, this is Nonesuch. Copied your previous, will also see you there, OUT.

One should always use one's own callsign when transmitting.

=== British Army ===
Station C21A (charlie-two-one Alpha) talking to C33B (charlie-three-three Bravo):

C21A: C33B, this is C21A, message, OVER.

C33B: C33B, send, OVER.

C21A: Have you got C1ØD Sunray at your location?, OVER.

C33B: Negative, I think he is with C3ØC, OVER.

C21A: Roger, OUT.

The advantage of this sequence is that the recipient always knows who sent the message.

The downside is that the listener only knows the intended recipient from the context of the conversation. Requires moderate signal quality for the radio operator to keep track of the conversations.

However a broadcast message and response is fairly efficient.

Sunray (Lead) Charlie Charlie (Collective Call - everyone), this is Sunray. Radio check, OVER.

C-E-5-9: Sunray, this is Charlie Echo five niner, LOUD AND CLEAR, OVER.

Y-S-7-2 Sunray, this is Yankee Sierra Seven Two, reading three by four. OVER.

B-G-5-2: Sunray, this is Bravo Golf Five Two, Say again. OVER.

E-F-2-0: Sunray, this is Echo Foxtrot Two Zero, reading Five by Four OVER.

Sunray: Charlie Charlie this is Sunray, OUT.

The "Say again" response from B-G-5-2 tells Sunray that the radio signal is not good and possibly unreadable. Sunray can then re-initiate a Call onto B-G-5-2 and start another R/C or instruct them to relocate, change settings, etc.

So it could carry on with:

Sunray: Bravo Golf Five Two this is sunray, RADIO CHECK OVER.

B-G-5-2: Sunray this is Bravo Golf Five Two, unclear, read you 2 by 3 OVER.

Sunray: Sunray copies, Relocate to Grid One Niner Zero Three Three Two for a better signal OVER.

B-G-5-2: Bravo Golf Five Two copies and is Oscar Mike, Bravo Golf Five Two OUT.

== See also ==
- Radiotelephone
- Mobile radio
- R-S-T system (for Amateur radio only)
- Circuit Merit (for wired and wireless telephone circuits only, not radiotelephony)
- List of international common standards
- Mayday
- Military slang
- Station identification
- Allied Communication Procedures
