= Time synchronization over radio =

Time synchronization over radio is the procedure used for time transfer performed by humans over two-way radio circuits, including voice, telegraph, and teletype.

== Radiotelegraph procedure ==
ACP 124(A) is the earliest Allied military document of the Cold War to define a time transfer method. It consists of:

Station	Transmission	Meaning
Request	I̅N̅T̅ ZUA	"Request a time signal now (or at ______)"
Reply	ZUA 1500	"Time signal will be transmitting at 1500." The numerals indicating the time will be followed by a 5-second dash, terminating exactly at the time indicated.

Note that ZUA is a military-only operating signal. Civilians would need to use the appropriate Q code operating signal, which also uses I̅M̅I̅ following the signal, instead of I̅N̅T̅ preceding the signal:

Station	Transmission	Meaning
Request	QTR I̅M̅I̅	"Request a time signal now (or at ______)"
Reply	QTR 1500	"Time signal will be transmitting at 1500." The numerals indicating the time will be followed by a 5-second dash, terminating exactly at the time indicated.

== Telephone and radiotelephone procedure ==
ACP 125(A) describes the format:

Station	Transmission
Request	"Request a time signal now" or "Request time signal at _____."
Reply	"When I say 'TIME' it will be exactly 1500. 15 seconds, 10 seconds, 5-4-3-2-1 TIME 1500."

ACP 125(G) updates the above procedure as follows:

Stations without the ability to acquire a time signal accurate to at least one second should request a time check at the start of every shift, or once a day minimum. Stations may ask the NCS for a time check by waiting for an appropriate pause, keying up and stating your call sign, and then using the prowords "REQUEST TIME CHECK, OVER" when the NCS calls on you. Otherwise, you may ask any station that has access to any of the above time signals for a time check.

Once requested, the sending station will state the current UTC time plus one minute, followed by a countdown as follows:

This is Net Control, TIME CHECK WUN AIT ZERO TOO ZULU (pause) WUN FIFE SECONDS…WUN ZERO SECONDS…FIFE FOWER TREE TOO WUN…TIME WUN AIT ZERO TOO ZULU…OVER

The receiving station will then use the proword "TIME" as the synch mark, indicating zero seconds. If the local time is desired instead of UTC, substitute the time zone code "JULIETT" for "ZULU".

Instead of providing time checks on an individual basis, the NCS should give advance notice of a time check by stating, for example, "TIME CHECK AT 0900 JULIETT", giving all stations sufficient time to prepare their clocks and watches for adjustment. A period of at least five minutes is suggested.

== Teletypewriter procedure ==
ACP 126(C): CommunicationCP 168s Instructions—Teletypewriter (Teleprinter) Procedures no longer describes the format

ACP 126(A) and possibly (B) described the format:

Station	Transmission	Meaning
Request	I̅N̅T̅ ZUA	"Request a time signal now (or at ______)"
Reply	ZUA 1500, 5-4-3-2-1-0.	

Due to the fact that different types of machines are used by the Member Nations, the time will be indicated by the printing:

- of the figures "zero" on machines printing each character as the appropriate key is pressed,
- or the figure "one" on machines printing one character in arrear of the key being pressed.

== Visual procedure ==
ACP 129: Communication Instructions—Visual Signaling Procedures originally documented the visual signalling procedure for time transfer. Subsequently, ACP 129 was combined with ACP 168: Pyrotechnic Signals to become ACP 130(A):Communications Instructions—Signalling Procedures in the Visual Medium.

=== Time by signal lamps ===
Example: D46 conveys intention to D06 to make a timing signal.
D46 makes	D06 makes
D06 (until answered)	K
ZUJ	Flash
ZUA	Flash
0845 (time zone)	Flash
K	R
Flash	
D46 makes a timing signal
D06 (until answered)	K
ZUA	Flash
0845 (time zone)	Flash
5 second flash	5 second flash
A̅R̅	Flash

ZUJ means "Stand by."

ZUA means "Timing signal will be transmitted now (or at...)"

=== Time by flag Hoists ===
Flag TANGO, followed by two or four numerals, also signifies a time check.

D46 makes	D06 makes
D06 (until answered)	K
I̅X̅	Flash
Flag T	Flash
1645 (time zone)	Flash
K	R
Flash	
(to execute)
D06 (until answered)	K
IX's	IX's
5 second flash	5 second flash
A̅R̅	Flash
	F

=== Time by time bells ===
The time signal indicated is at the instant of execution or commencement of hauling down of the shape.

== See also ==
- Time synchronization in North America
