= Procedure word =

Structured vocabulary for voice communication

Procedure words (abbreviated to prowords) are words or phrases limited to radiotelephony procedure used to facilitate communication by conveying information in a condensed standard verbal format. Prowords are voice versions of the much older procedural signs for Morse code which were first developed in the 1860s for Morse telegraphy, and their meaning is identical.

The NATO communications manual ACP-125 contains the most formal and perhaps earliest modern (post-World War II) glossary of prowords, but its definitions have been adopted by many other organizations, including the United Nations Development Programme, the U.S. Coast Guard, US Civil Air Patrol, US Military Auxiliary Radio System, and others.

Prowords are one of several structured parts of radio voice procedures, including brevity codes and plain language radio checks.

== Examples ==
According to the U.S. Marine Corps training document FMSO 108, "understanding the following PROWORDS and their respective definitions is the key to clear and concise communication procedures".

=== This is ... ===
This transmission is from the station whose designator immediately follows. For clarity, the station called should also be named, before the station calling. For example, "Victor Juliet zero, this is Golf Mike Oscar three...," or for brevity, "Victor Juliet zero, Golf Mike Oscar three...." The reverse ("This is GMO3 calling VJ0") is never allowed.

=== Over ===
"This is the end of my transmission to you and a response is necessary. Go ahead: transmit."

=== Out ===
"This is the end of my transmission to you, and no answer is required or expected."

"Over" and "Out" are never used at the same time, as their meanings are mutually exclusive.

=== Do you read? ===
A question about whether the receiver can hear and understand the transmission.

Example: "Bob, you read me? What is the situation from your position?"

Example:

A: "Air traffic control, do you read me? We have experienced a malfunction in one of our engines."
B: "Copy loud and clear. We are monitoring your position."

=== Roger ===
"ROGER" may be used to mean "yes" with regard to confirming a command; in Air Traffic Control phraseology, it does not signify that a clearance has been given. The term originates from the practice of telegraphers sending an "R" to stand for "received" after successfully getting a message. This was extended into spoken radio during World War II, with the "R" changed to the spelling alphabet equivalent word "Roger". The modern NATO spelling alphabet uses the word "Romeo" for "R" instead of "Roger", and "Romeo" is sometimes used for the same purpose as "Roger", mainly in Australian maritime operations.

=== Wilco ===
"I understand and will comply." It is used on receipt of an order. "Roger" and "Wilco" used together (e.g. "Roger, Wilco") are redundant, since "Wilco" includes the acknowledgement element of "Roger".

=== Say again ===
"I have not understood your message, please SAY AGAIN". Usually used with prowords "ALL AFTER" or "ALL BEFORE". Example: radio working between Solent Coastguard and a motor vessel, call-sign EG 93, where part of the initial transmission is unintelligible.

Example:

[SC] All stations, all stations, this is Solent Coastguard, Solent Coastguard. Be advised large shipping vessel entering Southampton Water, currently at position [transmission unintelligible] OUT
[EG 93] Solent Coastguard, Solent Coastguard, this is Echo Golf niner three. SAY AGAIN. OVER

At this juncture, Solent Coastguard would reply, preceding the message with the prowords "I SAY AGAIN":

[SC] All stations, all stations, this is Solent Coastguard. I SAY AGAIN, large shipping vessel entering Southampton water, currently at position one decimal two miles from Calshot Spit on bearing one six five degrees. Vessel restricted in ability to deviate from its course. Do not impede. OUT

The word "REPEAT" should not be used in place of "SAY AGAIN", especially on artillery fire control nets, as "REPEAT" is an artillery proword defined in ACP 125 U.S. Supp-2(A) with the wholly different meaning of "request for the same volume of fire to be fired again with or without corrections or changes" (e.g., at the same coordinates as the previous round).

=== All after... ===
"Please repeat the message you just sent me beginning after the word or phrase said after this proword."

Example:

[SC] All stations, all stations, this is Solent Coastguard, Solent Coastguard. Be advised large shipping vessel entering Southampton Water, currently at position [transmission unintelligible] OUT.
[EG 93] Solent Coastguard, Solent Coastguard, this is Echo Golf niner three. SAY AGAIN ALL AFTER "position". OVER.

At this juncture, Solent Coastguard would reply, preceding the message after "position" with the prowords "I SAY AGAIN":

[SC] All stations, all stations, this is Solent Coastguard. I SAY AGAIN, at position one decimal two miles from Calshot Spit on bearing one six five degrees. Vessel restricted in ability to deviate from its course. Do not impede. OUT.

=== All before... ===
"Please repeat the message you just sent me ending before the word or phrase said after this proword."

=== Wait over ===
"Wait for some time."

=== Standby ===
"I must pause for a few seconds."

=== Wait out ===
"I must pause for longer than a few seconds.."

=== Read back ===
"Please repeat my entire transmission back to me."

=== I read back ===
"The following is my response to your READ BACK proword."

=== Correction ===
"I made an error in this transmission. Transmission will continue with the last word correctly sent."

=== Radio check ===
"What is my signal strength and readability; how do you hear me?"

The sender requests a response indicating the strength and readability of their transmission, according to plain language radio check standards:

- A response of ROGER is shorthand for the prowords LOUD AND CLEAR.
- A response of WEAK BUT READABLE ("WEAK READABLE" is also used) indicates a weak signal but I can understand.
- A response of WEAK AND DISTORTED indicates a weak signal and unreadable.
- A response of STRONG BUT DISTORTED indicates a strong signal but unreadable. One of the two stations might be slightly off frequency, there might be multipath distortion, or there might be a problem with the audio circuits on one or both of the radios.

"5 by 5" is an older term used to assess radio signals, as in 5 out of 5 units for both signal strength and readability. Other terms similar to 5x5 are "LOUD AND CLEAR" or "Lima and Charlie". Example:

Alpha 12: "X-ray two-three, this is Alpha one-two, RADIO CHECK, OVER."
X-ray 23: "Alpha one-two, this is X-ray two-three, I read you 5 by 5, OVER."
Alpha 12: "Alpha one-two ROGER, OUT."

Similar example in shorter form:

Alpha 12: "X-ray two-three, this is Alpha one-two, RADIO CHECK, OVER
X-ray 23: "Alpha one-two, this is X-ray two-three, ROGER, OUT

If the initiating station (Alpha 12 in the example) cannot hear the responding station (X-ray 23 above), then the initiator attempts a radio-check again, or if the responder's signal was not heard, the initiator replies to the responder with "Negative contact, Alpha 12 OUT".

The following readability scale is used: 1 = bad (unreadable); 2 = poor (readable now and then); 3 = fair (readable, but with difficulty); 4 = good (readable); 5 = excellent (perfectly readable).

Example of correct US Army radio check, for receiver A-11 (Alpha 11) and sender D-12 (Delta 12):

A-11 This is D-12 RADIO CHECK, OVER
D-12 This is A-11 ROGER, OVER
A-11 this is D-12 ROGER, OUT

== Article 32 Radio Regulations distress and rescue ==
International Telecommunication Union (ITU) Radio Regulations and the International Civil Aviation Organization (ICAO) Convention and Procedures for Air Navigation Services set out "distress, urgency and safety procedures".

On the radio, distress (emergency) and rescue usage takes precedence above all other usage, and the radio stations at the scene of the disaster (on land, in a plane, or on a boat) are authorized to commandeer the frequency and prohibit all transmissions that are not involved in assisting them. These procedure words originate in the International Radio Regulations.

The Combined Communications-Electronics Board (representing military use by Australia, Canada, New Zealand, United Kingdom and United States) sets out their usage in the Allied Communications Publications "ACP 135(F) Communications instructions Distress and Rescue Procedures".

=== Mayday ===
Mayday is used internationally as the official SOS/distress call for voice. It means that the caller, their vessel or a person aboard the vessel is in grave and imminent danger, send immediate assistance. This call takes priority over all other calls.

The correct format for a Mayday call is as follows:

[The first part of the signal is known as the "call"]

Mayday, Mayday, Mayday
This is (vessel name repeated three times, followed by call sign if available)

[The subsequent part of the signal is known as the "message"]

Mayday (vessel name)
My position is (position as a lat-long position or bearing and distance from a fixed point)
I am (type of distress, e.g. on fire and sinking)
I require immediate assistance
I have (number of people on board and their condition)
(Any other information e.g. "I am abandoning to life rafts")

Over

VHF instructors, specifically those working for the Royal Yachting Association, often suggest the mnemonic MIPDANIO for learning the message of a Mayday signal: mayday, identify, position, distress, assistance, number-of-crew, information, over.

In aviation a different format is used:

[First part of the message] Mayday, Mayday, Mayday

[Second part of the message] Callsign

[Third part of the message] Nature of the emergency

For example: "Mayday, Mayday, Mayday, Wiki Air 999, we have lost both of our engines due to a bird strike, we are gliding now."

After that the pilot can give, or the controller can ask for, additional related information such as fuel conditions, number of passengers on board, and so on.

=== Pan-Pan ===
Pan-pan (pronounced /ˈpæn ˈpæn/) is the official urgency voice call.

Meaning "I, my vessel, or a person aboard my vessel, require, or requires, assistance, but am, or is, not in distress." This overrides all but a mayday call, and is used, as an example, for calling for medical assistance or if the station has no means of propulsion. The correct usage is:

Pan-Pan, Pan-Pan, Pan-Pan

All stations, all stations, all stations
This is [vessel name repeated three times]
My position is [position as a lat-long position or bearing and distance from a fixed point]
I am [type of urgency, e.g. drifting without power in a shipping lane]
I require [type of assistance required]
[Any other information e.g. size of vessel, which may be important for towing]

Over

=== SÉCURITÉ ===
Pronounced /seɪˈkjuːrɪteɪ/ say-KURE-i-tay, this is the official safety voice call.

"I have important meteorological, navigational or safety information to pass on." This call is normally broadcast on a defined channel (channel 16 for maritime VHF) and then moved onto another channel to pass the message. Example:

[On channel 16]

SÉCURITÉ, SÉCURITÉ, SÉCURITÉ

All stations, all stations, all stations.

This is Echo Golf niner three, Echo Golf niner three, Echo Golf niner three.

For urgent navigational warning, listen on channel six-seven.

OUT

[Then on a working channel]

SÉCURITÉ, SÉCURITÉ, SÉCURITÉ

All stations, all stations, all stations.

This is Echo Golf niner tree (three), Echo Golf niner tree, Echo Golf niner tree.

Floating debris sighted off Calshot Spit.

Considered a danger to surface navigation.

OUT

=== SEELONCE MAYDAY ===
"Seelonce" is an approximation rendition of the French word silence and indicates that your vessel has an emergency and that you are requiring radio silence from all other stations not assisting you.

=== SEELONCE DISTRESS ===
Indicates that you are relaying or assisting a station that has placed a MAYDAY call and you are requiring radio silence from all other stations not assisting you or the station in distress.

When the emergency issue is winding down or nearly resolved, the two subsequent prowords (below) are used to open up the frequency for use by stations not involved in the emergency:

=== PRU-DONCE ===
From the French word prudence and indicates that complete radio silence is no longer required and restricted (i.e., limited) use of the frequency may resume, but must still immediately give way in the event of further distress communications.

=== SEELONCE FEENEE ===
From the French word silence and fini (ended) and indicates that emergency communications have ceased and normal use of the frequency may resume.

== ACP 125(F) ==
| Proword | Meaning | Prosign/ OPSIG |
|---|---|---|
| ACKNOWLEDGE (ACK) | An instruction to the addressee that the message must be acknowledged | ZEV or QSL |
| ADDRESS GROUP | The group that follows is an address group | |
| ALL AFTER | The portion of the message to which I have reference is all that follows............... | AA |
| ALL BEFORE | The portion of the message to which I have reference is all that precedes.............. | AB |
| ANSWER AFTER | The station called is to answer after call sign........when answering transmissions. | ZGO |
| ASSUME CONTROL | You will assume control of this net until further notice | ZKD |
| AUTHENTICATE | The station called is to reply to the challenge that follows | INT ZNB |
| AUTHENTICATION IS | The transmission authentication of this message is.......... | |
| BREAK | I hereby indicate the separation of the text from other portions of the message | BT |
| BROADCAST YOUR NET | Link the two nets under your control for automatic rebroadcast | |
| CALL SIGN | The group that follows is a call sign | |
| CLOSE DOWN | Stations are to close down when indicated. Acknowledgments are required | ZKJ |
| CORRECT | You are correct, or what you have transmitted is correct. | C |
| CORRECTION | An error has been made in this transmission. Transmission will continue with the last word correctly transmitted. An error has been made in this transmission (or message indicated). The correct version is... That which follows is a corrected version in answer to your request for verification" | EEEEEEEE; C C |
| DISREGARD THIS TRANSMISSION – OUT | This transmission is in error, disregard it. (This proword shall not be used to cancel any message that has been completely transmitted and received.) | EEEEEEEE AR |
| DO NOT ANSWER | Stations called are not to answer this call, receipt for this message, or otherwise transmit in connection with this transmission. When this proword is employed, the transmission shall be ended with the proword OUT. | F |
| EXECUTE | Carry out the purport of the message or signal to which this applies. (To be used only with the Executive Method.) | IX----- |
| EXECUTE TO FOLLOW | Action on the message or signal that follows is to be carried out upon receipt of the proword EXECUTE. (To be used only with the Delayed Executive Method.) | IX |
| EXEMPT | The station(s) immediately following is (are) exempted from the collective call or from collective address | XMT |
| FIGURES | Numerals or numbers follow. | |
| FLASH | Precedence FLASH. | Z |
| FROM | The originator of this message is indicated by the address designator immediately following | FM |
| GRID | The portion following is a grid reference | |
| GROUPS | This message contains the number of groups indicated by the numeral following. | GR |
| GROUP NO COUNT | The groups in this message have not been counted. | GRNC |
| I AM ASSUMING CONTROL | I am assuming control of this net until further notice | ZKA |
| I AUTHENTICATE | The group that follows is the reply to your challenge to authenticate | ZNB |
| IMMEDIATE | Precedence IMMEDIATE | O |
| IMMEDIATE EXECUTE | Action on the message or signal following is to be carried out on receipt of the EXECUTE. (To be used only with the Immediate Executive Method.) | IX |
| INFO | The addressees immediately following are addressed for information | INFO |
| I READ BACK | The following is my response to your instructions to read back | IRB |
| I SAY AGAIN | I am repeating transmission or portion indicated. | IMI |
| I SPELL | I shall spell the next word phonetically. | |
| I VERIFY | That which follows has been verified at your request and is repeated. (To be used only as a reply to VERIFY.) | C |
| MESSAGE | A message that requires recording is about to follow. (Transmitted immediately after the call. This proword is not used on nets primarily employed for conveying messages. It is intended for use when messages are passed on tactical or reporting nets.) | ZBO |
| MORE TO FOLLOW | Transmitting station has additional traffic for the receiving station. | B |
| NEGATIVE (NEGAT) | No. Cancel message(s) sent by the Delayed Executive Method. (NEGAT may be used to cancel a single message or a group of messages awaiting execution.) | ZUG |
| NET NOW | All stations are to net their radios on the unmodulated carrier wave that I am about to transmit. | ZRC2 |
| NO PLAY | During exercises the words NO PLAY are used to distinguish real activity from messages concerned with exercise play e.g. a real emergency or real casualty. The first words of any message is to contain the words exercise (nickname e.g.Red Flag) NO PLAY | |
| NOTHING HEARD | To be used when no reply is received from a call station. | ZGN |
| NUMBER | Station serial number. | NR |
| OUT | This is the end of my transmission to you and no answer is required or expected. | AR |
| OVER | This is the end of my transmission to you and a response is necessary. Go ahead, transmit | K |
| PRIORITY | Precedence PRIORITY | P |
| READ BACK | Repeat this entire transmission back to me exactly as received | G |
| REBROADCAST YOUR NET | Link the two nets under your control for automatic rebroadcast. | |
| RELAY (TO) | Transmit this message to all addressees (or addressees immediately following this proword). The address component is mandatory when this proword is used. | T or ZOF |
| RELAY THROUGH | Relay your message through call sign......... | ZOK |
| ROGER | This is a method of receipt. I have received your last transmission satisfactorily. | R |
| ROUTINE | Precedence ROUTINE. | R |
| SAY AGAIN | Repeat all of your last transmission. Followed by identification data means "Repeat………… (portion indicated).” | IMI |
| SEND YOUR | I am ready to receive your message, report, etc. | K |
| | (Used only in reply to the offer of a message, etc., on tactical or reporting nets.) | |
| SERVICE | The message that follows is a SERVICE message | SVC |
| SIGNALS | The groups that follow are taken from a signal book. (This proword is not used on nets primarily employed for conveying signals. It is intended for use when tactical signals are passed on non-tactical nets.) | |
| SILENCE (Repeated three or more times) | Cease transmissions on this net immediately. Silence will be maintained until lifted. (Transmissions must be authenticated by use of a self authenticated system, codeword, etc.) | HM HM HM |
| SILENCE LIFTED | Silence is lifted. (Transmissions must be authenticated by means of self authentication system, codeword, etc.) | ZUG HM HM HM |
| SPEAK SLOWER | Your transmission is too fast. Reduce speed of transmission. | QRS |
| STOP REBROADCASTING | Cut the automatic link between the two nets that are being rebroadcast and revert to normal working. | |
| THIS IS | This transmission is from the station whose designator immediately follows. | DE |
| THIS IS A DIRECTED NET | From now until further notice this net is directed. | ZKB |
| THIS IS A FREE NET | From now until further notice this net is free. | ZUG ZKB |
| THROUGH ME | Relay your message through me | ZOE |
| TIME | That which immediately follows is the time or datetime group of the message. | QTR |
| TO | The addressees immediately following are addressed for action | TO |
| --TO-- | The portion of the message to which I have reference is all that which appears between the groups.........and......... | |
| UNKNOWN STATION | The identity of the station with whom I am attempting to establish communication is unknown. | AA |
| USE ABBREVIATED CALL SIGNS | Call signs are to be abbreviated until further notice. | |
| USE ABBREVIATED PROCEDURE | As conditions are normal, all stations are to use abbreviated procedure until further notice. | |
| USE FULL CALL SIGNS | Call signs are to be sent in full until further notice | |
| USE FULL PROCEDURE | As conditions are not normal, all stations are to use full procedure until further notice. | |
| VERIFY | Verify entire message (or portion indicated) with the originator and send correct version. (To be used only at the discretion of, or by, the addressee to which the questioned message was directed.) | J |
| WAIT | I must pause for a few seconds | AS |
| WAIT – OUT | I must pause for longer than a few seconds. | AS AR |
| WILCO | I have Received your signal, understand it, and will comply. To be used only by the addressee. Since the meaning of ROGER is included in that of WILCO, the two prowords are never used together. | |
| WORD AFTER | The word of the message to which I have reference is that which follows.............. | WA |
| WORD BEFORE | The word of the message to which I have reference is that which precedes.............. | WB |
| WORDS TWICE | Communication is difficult. Transmit each phrase (or each code group) twice. (This proword may be used as an order, request, or as information.) | QSZ |
| WRONG | Your last transmission was incorrect. The correct version is....... | ZWF |

== Aviation radio ==
More formally known as "Aeronautical Mobile communications", radio communications from and to aircraft are governed by rules created by the International Civil Aviation Organization. ICAO defines a very similar but shorter list of prowords in Annex 10 of its Radiotelephony Procedures (to the Convention on International Civil Aviation). Material in the following table is quoted from their list. ICAO also defines "ICAO Radio Telephony Phraseology".

| Proword | Meaning | Notes |
|---|---|---|
| Acknowledge | Let me know that you have received and understood this message | |
| Affirmative or Affirm | Yes. | |
| Approved | Permission for proposed action granted. | |
| Break | I hereby indicate the separation between portions of the message. | |
| Break Break | I hereby indicate the separation between messages transmitted to different aircraft in a very busy environment | |
| Cancel | Annul the previously transmitted clearance | |
| Check | Examine a system or procedure | |
| Cleared | Authorized to proceed under conditions specified. | |
| Confirm | I request verification of: (clearance, instruction, action information). | |
| Contact | Establish communications with... | |
| Correct | True or Accurate | |
| Correction | An error has been made in this transmission (or message indicated). The correct version is... | |
| Disregard | Ignore | |
| How Do You Read | What is the readability of my transmission | |
| I say again | I repeat for clarity or emphasis. | |
| Monitor | Listen out on (frequency) | Often used by terminal controllers when instructing the recipient to tune into a different frequency and listen in, but refrain from creating unnecessary radio traffic. |
| Negative | "No" or "Permission not granted", or "That is not correct" or "Not capable" | |
| Over | My transmission is ended, and I expect a response from you. | |
| Out | This exchange of transmissions is ended and no response is expected. | |
| Read Back | Repeat all, or the specified part, of this message back to me exactly as received. | |
| Recleared | A change has been made to your last clearance and this new clearance supersedes your previous clearance or part thereof. | |
| Report | Pass me the following information... | |
| Request | I should like to know... | |
| Roger | I have received all of your last transmission. | |
| Say Again | Repeat all, or the following part, of your last transmission. | |
| Speak Slower | Reduce your rate of speech | Normal rate of speech is to never exceed 100 words per minute. This rate is still too fast for most people to write or type, so SPEAK SLOWER means a significant drop. |
| Standby | Wait and I will call you. | |
| Unable | I cannot comply with your request, instruction, or clearance. | |
| Wilco | I understand your message and will comply with it. | |
| Words Twice | (As a request) Communication is difficult. Please send every word, or group of words, twice. | |

== Marine radio ==
Marine radio procedure words follow from the ACP-125 definition, and those in the International Radio Regulations published by the ITU, and should be used by small vessels as their standard radio procedure. Beginning in 2001, large vessels, defined as being 500 gross tonnage or greater, the International Convention on Standards of Training, Certification and Watchkeeping for Seafarers has required that a restricted and simplified English vocabulary with pre-set phrases, called Standard Marine Communication Phrases (SMCP), be used and understood by all officers in charge of a navigational watch. These rules are enforced by the International Maritime Organization (IMO). The IMO describes the purpose of SMCP, explaining "The IMO SMCP includes phrases which have been developed to cover the most important safety-related fields of verbal shore-to-ship (and vice-versa), ship-to-ship and on-board communications. The aim is to get round the problem of language barriers at sea and avoid misunderstandings which can cause accidents."

The SMCP language is not free-form like the standard radio voice procedures and procedure words. Instead, it consists of entire pre-formed phrases carefully designed for each situation, and watch officers must pass a test of their usage in order to be certified under international maritime regulations. For example, ships in their own territorial waters might be allowed to use their native language, but when navigating at sea or communicating with foreign vessels in their own territorial waters, they should switch to SMCP, and will state the switch over the radio before using the procedures. When it is necessary to indicate that the SMCP are to be used, the following message may be sent: "Please use Standard Marine Communication Phrases." "I will use Standard Marine Communication Phrases."

=== SMCP ===
- "Yes" when the answer to a question is in the affirmative
- "No" when the answer to a question is in the negative
- "Stand by" when the information requested is not immediately available
- "No information" when the information requested cannot be obtained

== Misusages ==
=== Clear ===
"Clear" is sometimes heard in amateur radio transmissions to indicate the sending station is done transmitting and leaving the airways, i.e. turning off the radio, but the Clear proword is reserved for a different purpose, that of specifying the classification of a 16-line format radio message as one which can be sent 'in clear [language]' (without encryption), as well as being reserved for use in responding to the Radio Check proword to indicate the readability of the radio transmission.

=== Affirmative ===
"Confirm" or "yes" and sometimes shortened to Affirm is heard in several radio services, but is not listed in ACP-125 as a proword. In poor radio conditions Affirmative can be confused with Negative. Instead, the proword Correct is used.

=== Negative ===
Means "no", and can be abbreviated to Negat. Because over a poor quality connection the words "affirmative" and "negative" can be mistaken for one another (for example over a sound-powered telephone circuit), United States Navy instruction omits the use of either as prowords. Sailors are instructed to instead use "yes" and "no".

== Example of usage ==
=== Example 1 ===
Two helicopters, call signs "Swiss 610" and "Swiss 613", are flying in formation :

Swiss 610: "613, I have a visual on you at my 3 o'clock. 610"
Swiss 613: "Roger 613"
Swiss 610: "613, Turn right to a heading of 090. 610"
Swiss 613: "Wilco 613"

Anytime a radio call is made (excepting "standby", where the correct response is silence), there is some kind of response indicating that the original call was heard. 613's "Roger" confirms to 610 that the information was heard. In the second radio call from 610, direction was given. 613's "Wilco" means "will comply."

Reading back an instruction confirms that it was heard correctly. For example, if all 613 says is "Wilco", 610 cannot be certain that he correctly heard the heading as 090. If 613 replies with a read back and the word "Wilco" ("Turn right zero-niner-zero, Wilco") then 610 knows that the heading was correctly understood, and that 613 intends to comply.

=== Example 2 ===
The following is the example of working between two stations, EG93 and VJ50 demonstrating how to confirm information:

EG93: "Victor Juliet five zero, Victor Juliet five zero, this is Echo Golf niner three. Request rendezvous at 51 degrees 37.0N, 001 degrees 49.5W. Read back for check. Over"
VJ50: "Echo Golf niner three, this is Victor Juliet five zero. I read back: five one degrees three seven decimal zero north, zero zero one degrees four niner decimal five west. Over."
EG93: "Victor Juliet five zero, this is Echo Golf niner three. Correct, Out"

=== Example 3 ===
The following is the example of working between MACV-SOG operator and a gunship demonstrating how to confirm information:

MACV-SOG: "Texas, this is Sierra Oscar Golf X-Ray. Priority one, ordnance on my command. I authenticate, golf shoe, over."
RT Texas: "Affirmative, X-Ray. Let us know when you need us."

== See also ==
- Allied Communication Procedures
- Brevity code
- NATO phonetic alphabet
- Prosigns for Morse code
- Ten-code
- Distress signal
- Plain language radio checks
