= Reception report =

Signal reports of radio broadcasts

A reception report is a means by which radio stations (usually short- and medium-wave broadcasters) receive detailed feedback from their listeners about the quality and content of their broadcasts. A reception report consists of several pieces of information which help the station verify that the report confirms coverage of their transmission, and usually include the following information:

- Date, time and frequency (in kHz) of the transmission
- Station name
- Description of the interval signal, if heard
- Programme details
- Name of announcers or programme host, if heard
- Details of the overall signal quality (normally using the SINPO code)

The listener's location relative to the station is also useful; this indicates how well the station's transmitter is performing and in which direction(s) its antenna is beaming the signal. The station also evaluates a reception report in light of the listener's receiver and antenna. Upon receipt of a correct report, a broadcaster sometimes issues a letter or postcard (known as a QSL card) to the sender, thanking them and confirming that the details are correct. "QSL" is part of the amateur radio Q code, meaning "I acknowledge receipt". One aspect of DXing is collecting QSL cards and letters from stations heard (similar to a birdwatcher's "life list"). QSLing a radio station involves writing an accurate reception report, mailing it to the station and awaiting a reply. Since QSLing is a voluntary act on the station's part, several techniques are used to improve a listener's success rate.

== Useful reception reports ==
Station engineers and other personnel are primarily interested in whether or not their station is heard, and how well; therefore, a complete and accurate reception report (whether by postal or e-mail) is generally appreciated. To begin, report the frequency, date and time the station was heard. For medium-wave (AM) stations, the time should be that of the time zone in which the station is located. Thus, if a listener hears stations from the Eastern time zone of North America (such as Ontario and New York), EST or EDT should be given (depending on the time of year). Stations in the Central time zone (such as Chicago) use CST or CDT, which is one hour earlier than Eastern time. If a listener is uncertain of the time zone, they should clearly indicate their local time or even better use UTC

It is helpful to jot down programming as it is heard. Useful details include:

- Station identification
- Program name
- Names of station announcers (such as a talk show host)
- Commercials (good indicators, because the station keeps a logbook of commercials
- Names of network programs, such as "CNN News" or "TSN Sports"

The purpose of providing this information is to prove to the station that you heard their program and not that of another station. The more detail a listener can provide, the better the chance of eliciting a QSL. Include information, also, about how well the signal was received. For medium-wave reports, an indication of signal strength and any interference (co- or adjacent-channel interference, with identity of interfering station if possible) is usually sufficient. International shortwave broadcasters are familiar with the SINPO code:

- Signal strength
- Interference (includes human-generated noise—for example, power-line hum)
- Noise ("white noise", or thunderstorm static)
- Propagation disturbance (fading)
- Overall reception quality

Each letter receives a value between 5 and 1, where 5 is the best and 1 the worst. Many shortwave listeners (known as "program listeners") desire nothing more than music and news from a broadcaster; however, for DXers a QSL collection is tangible proof of what they have heard. Some listeners use pre-printed forms if they are unfamiliar with the language spoken by station personnel. While major international broadcasters have not required return postage for a QSL, the growing popularity of e-mailed reception reports and e-QSLs has largely eliminated the necessity for international reply coupons (IRCs), mint stamps from the verifying station's country or "green stamps" (US dollar bills).
