= Allied Communication Procedures =

Set of manuals and supplements published by the CCEB

Allied Communication Procedures is the set of manuals and supplements published by the Combined Communications Electronics Board that prescribe the methods and standards to be used while conducting visual, audible, radiotelegraph, and radiotelephone communications within NATO member nations. These procedures relate to procedure words, radiotelephony procedure, Allied Military phonetic spelling alphabets, plain language radio checks, the 16-line message format (radiogram), and others.

== Current procedures ==
Throughout the Cold War, the list of procedures was extensive (see Combined Communications Electronics Board#Allied Communications Publications), but has been pared down to simplify the training required of communications personnel and others who must know the procedures.

Current Allied Communication Publications
Short Name	Revision	Title	First Published	Date of Current Version	Status	Description
ACP 113	AJ	Call Sign Book for Ships		2017-12-13	Published	Contains lists of: International Call Signs and hull numbers for ships; two letter Tactical Air Navigation; and Task Forces and their allocations.
ACP 120	Original	Common Security Protocol (CSP)		1998	Frozen	Describes additional functionality to the CCITT X.400 Recommendations (either 1984, 1988, or 1992) that permit any type of message (including interpersonal messages) to be sent and received securely.
ACP 121	I	Communication Instructions General		2010-10	Published	Provides general information and guidance on military communications matters to: promote an understanding of the concepts and capabilities; facilitate their use; and explain signal message composition.
ACP 122	G	Information Assurance for Allied Communications and Information Systems		2015-02	Published	Establish a risk acceptance framework to facilitate the interconnection and interoperation of CIS between the Combined Communications-Electronics Board (CCEB) nations, and, where necessary, to support the development of Allied IA agreements.
ACP 123	B	ACP 123 Common Messaging Strategy and Procedures		2014-03	Unknown	
ACP 125	G	Communications Instructions—Radiotelephone Procedures		2016-11-29	Published	To prescribe the voice procedure for use by the armed forces of Allied nations on secure and non-secure tactical voice nets. Its purpose is to provide a standardized way of passing speech and data traffic as securely as possible.
ACP 126	C	Communications Instructions: Teletypewriter (Teleprinter) Procedures		1989-05	Withdrawn 2016-10-20	ACP 126(C) is now withdrawn from publication. This copy is retained for reference only. JAFPUB 2016-49 refers.
ACP 127	G	Communications Instructions—Tape Relay Procedures		1988-11	Frozen	The purpose of this publication is to prescribe the procedure to be employed for the handling of messages by manual, semiautomatic or fully automatic relay systems, referred to collectively as TAPE RELAY.
ACP 128	B	Allied Telecommunications Record System (ALTERS) Operating Procedures		2016-04	Published	This publication prescribes the operating procedures and practices applicable to the ALLIED TELECOMMUNICATIONS RECORD SYSTEM (ALTERS) and to other record communications networks as specifically authorized by respective controlling authorities.
ACP 130	A	Communications Instructions—Signalling Procedures in the Visual Medium		2005-07	Published	The procedures prescribed herein are designed to provide a concise and definite language whereby visual communications in all mediums may be conducted accurately and rapidly.
ACP 131	F	Communications Instructions: Operating Signals		2009-04	Published	The purpose of this publication is to list operating signals and provide instructions for their use.
ACP 133	D	Common Directory Services and Procedures		2014-09	Published	To define the Directory services, architecture(s), protocols, schema, policies, and procedures to support Allied communications, including Military Message Handling System (MMHS) services based on ACP 123, in both the strategic and tactical environments.
ACP 133 SUPP-1	A	Communications Instructions: Common Directory Services and Procedures Supplement		2009-07	Published	Provides the Directory schema definition for ACP 133.
ACP 135	F	Communications Instructions: Distress and Rescue Procedures		2003-07	Frozen	The procedures in this Chapter are in accordance with ITU radio regulations and are obligatory in the Maritime Mobile Service and for communications between aircraft stations and stations of the Maritime Mobile Service
ACP 137	A	Pegasus Directory Services Technical Architecture		2016-04	Published	Specifies a DS architecture and defines protocols for the exchange of directory information over networks. ACP 137 is required to meet the needs of evolving Pegasus collaborative services.
ACP 142	A	A Protocol for Reliable Multicast in Bandwidth Constrained and Delayed Acknowledgement (EMCON) Environments		2008-10	Published	Specify and standardise the P_MUL protocol.
ACP 145	A	Interim Implementation Guide for ACP 123/STANAG 4406 Messaging Services Between Nations		2008-09	Published	Provide a consolidated reference of all policy, procedures, standards and agreements required for the implementation of the agreed ACP 123/STANAG 4406 architecture between Nations.
ACP 160	E	IFF Operational Procedures		2014-09	Published	Provide a foundation for establishing detailed Identification Friend or Foe (IFF) operational policies and procedures that reside in national, regional and allied supplements.
ACP 167	K	Glossary of Communications-Electronics Terms		2016-03	Published	To list and define terms essential to: communication between allies; enhance interoperability; provide definition of common terms; & primary source reference for terminology.
ACP 185	A	Public Key Infrastructure (PKI) Cross-Certification Between Combined Communications-Electronics Board (CCEB) Nations		2016-04	Published	Establishes the framework for PKI interoperability to facilitate the cross-certification of CCEB National Defence/Defence Public Key (NDPKI).
ACP 190	D	Guide to Electromagnetic Spectrum Management in Military Operations		2013-02	Published	Provides guidance n the organization required and the responsibilities of staff engaged in planning, coordinating, and managing access to the Electromagnetic Spectrum in military operations.
ACP 193	A	Ground Routing Protocol for use with Automatic Link Establishment (ALE) Capable HF Radios		2009-10	Published	Defines a text message format for use with automated HF (high frequency, i.e. 1.5-30 MHz) communication systems when automated routing of communication links over ground networks is required. The formatted routing message shall be known as the HF-GRP.
ACP 194	Original	Policy for the Coordination of Military Electromagnetic Spectrum Allocations and Assignments Between Cooperating Nations		2011-06	Published	Nations, or coalitions of nations, are responsible for reviewing and coordinating the allocation and assignment of frequencies at the military-strategic level to satisfy their joint and combined military requirements.
ACP 198	O	Instructions for the Life Cycle Management of Allied Communications Publications (ACPs)		2017-10-19	Published	The purpose of this instruction is to prescribe policy and procedures for the preparation and life cycle management of Allied Communications Publications (ACPs).
ACP 200.V1	D	Maritime and Mobile Tacticalwide Area networking (MTWAN) in the Maritime Environment: Operating Guidance		2013-07	Published	This publication provides guidance as to the procedures, applications, infrastructure and data attributes required for tactical Mobile IP networking in a maritime environment
ACP 200.V2	D	Maritime and Mobile Tactical Wide Area Networking (MTWAN): Tactical Guidance		2015-03	Published	ACP 200(D) Vol II provides the Communications Specialist and Support Engineers on how to technically provide MTWAN.
ACP 201	A	Communications Instructions Internet Protocol (IP) Services		2017-04	Published	To meet and sustain warfighters‘ messaging requirement, an operational construct that effectively and efficiently employs all available information tools.
ACP 220	B	Multinational Videoconferencing Services		2013-03	Published	This ACP supports the Combined Joint Multilateral Master Military Information Exchange Memorandum of Understanding (CJM3IEM). These documents communicate all necessary interoperability standards, procedures, security instructions, and related info.
ACP 230	A	Pegasus Service Operations Management Framework (PSOM)		2018-03-21	Published	The purpose of Pegasus service operations management is to coordinate and to carry out the activities and processes required to deliver and manage services to the end user.
ACP 240	A	Data-Centric Security Interoperability Concepts and Design Requirements		2025-05-08	Published	This ACP enables data-centric security and interoperability, protecting the data representation on information directly rather than the networks and infrastructure.in multinational military operations. It utilizes the Zero Trust Data Format (ZTDF) to embed encryption and access controls directly into data objects.
