= Plain language radio checks =

Operating signals for radio signal quality

A plain-language radio check is the means of requesting and giving a signal strength and readability report for radiotelephony (voice) communications, and is the direct equivalent to the QSA and QRK code used to give the same report in radiotelegraph (Morse code) communications. SINPEMFO code is the voice signal reporting format developed by the ITU in 1959, but sees little use outside of shortwave listeners.

Allied Communications Procedure 125(F), Communication Instructions Radiotelephone Procedure, published by the Combined Communication Electronics Board, defines radiotelephone procedures, and contains the original definitions for many common radio communications procedures, including Procedure Words, radio net operations, etc. Section 611 of ACP 125(F) details how to conduct radio checks using plain language.

== Radio check procedure ==
The prowords listed below are for use when initiating and answering queries concerning signal strength and readability.

Proword	Meaning
RADIO CHECK	What is my signal strength and readability; how do you hear me?
ROGER	I have received your last transmission satisfactorily.
NOTHING HEARD	To be used when no reply is received from a called station.

=== Signal strength prowords ===
Proword	Meaning
LOUD	Your signal is very strong.
GOOD	Your signal strength is good.
WEAK	Your signal strength is weak.
VERY WEAK	Your signal strength is very weak.
FADING	At times your signal strength fades to such an extent that continuous reception cannot be relied upon.

=== Readability prowords ===
Proword	Meaning
CLEAR	The quality of your transmission is excellent.
READABLE	The quality of your transmission is satisfactory.
UNREADABLE	The quality of your transmission is so bad that I cannot read you.
DISTORTED	Having trouble reading you due to interference.
WITH INTERFERENCE	Having trouble reading you due to interference.
INTERMITTENT	Having trouble reading you because your signal is intermittent.

== Examples of usage ==
One of these reports, "LOUD AND CLEAR", is commonly used in television shows, movies, literature, and by radio operators, commonly without knowing the source or the rest of the standard reports (hence the much-reduced frequency with which the other combinations are used). For example:

- LOUD AND CLEAR means Excellent copy with no noise
- LOUD BUT DISTORTED means the signal strength is very strong but the audio is distorted.
- GOOD AND READABLE means Good copy with slight noise
- FAIR BUT READABLE means Fair copy, occasional fills are needed
- WEAK BUT READABLE means Weak copy, frequent fills are needed
- WEAK WITH INTERFERENCE means the signal strength is weak and there is also interference from another signal.
- WEAK AND UNREADABLE means Unable to copy, a relay is required

The omission of comment on signal strength and readability, by responding only with the proword ROGER, is understood to mean that reception is LOUD AND CLEAR. If reception is other than loud and clear, it must be described with the appropriate prowords.

Reports such as "five by five", "four by four", etc., will not be used to indicate strength and quality of reception.

== See also ==
- QSA and QRK code (for Morse code only)
- R-S-T system (for Amateur radio only)
- SINPO code
- Signal strength and readability report
- Circuit Merit (for wired and wireless telephone circuits only, not radiotelephony)
- Procedure Words
- Allied Communication Procedures
