= QSA and QRK radio signal reports =

Morse code operating signal for signal quality reports

The QSA code and QRK code are interrelated and complementary signal reporting codes for use in wireless telegraphy (Morse code). An enhanced format, SINPO code, was published in the ITU Radio Regulations, Geneva, 1959, but is longer and unwieldy for use in the fast pace of Morse code communications.

== Current format ==
The current definition of the QSA and QRK codes are officially defined in ITU Radio Regulations 1990, Appendix 13: Miscellaneous Abbreviations and Signals to Be Used in Radiotelegraphy Communications Except in the Maritime Mobile Service, and are also described identically in ACP131(F),:

Signal	Question	Answer, Advice, or Order
QSA	What is the strength of my signals (or those of...)?	The strength of your signals (or those of...) is...: 1. scarcely perceptible 2. weak 3. fairly good 4. good 5. very good
QRK	What is the intelligibility of my signals (or those of...)?	The intelligibility of your signals (or those of...) is...: 1. bad 2. poor 3. fair 4. good 5. excellent

== Historical development ==
The QSK code is one of the earliest signal reporting formats and is a part of the Q code used for commercial radiotelegraph communication, appearing as one of the twelve Q Codes listed in the 1912 International Radiotelegraph Convention Regulations, and was later adopted by other radio services, especially amateur radio. The QSA code was mandated by the Madrid Convention (Appendix 10, General Regulations) sometime prior to 1936, and specified the following reporting format, as found in the 1936 edition of the ARRL's The Radio Amateur's Handbook and Radiotelegraph & Radiotelephone Codes, Prowords, and Abbreviations.

Request from first station	Response from receiving station	Meaning
QRK (replaced earlier QJS)	QSA1	Hardly perceptible, unreadable
QRK (replaced earlier QJS)	QSA2	Weak, readable now and then
QRK (replaced earlier QJS)	QSA3	Fairly good, readable but with difficulty
QRK (replaced earlier QJS)	QSA4	Good, readable
QRK (replaced earlier QJS)	QSA5	Very good, perfectly readable

The book goes on to note that "Some of the definitions, however, appear to confuse audibility or signal strength with readability, which may be impaired even when signals are strong, by atmospherics, interference, a noisy receiver, etc.", and that because of this Amateurs supplemented the QSA system reports with a readability scale, called the R-System, which used a scale of 1 to 9. The book describes the QSA- and R-systems immediately after describing the R-S-T system, and notes that the R-S-T report format, because it is three digits long, cannot be confused with either of the earlier systems. The book does not clarify the method for requesting an R-S-T report instead of a QSA report.

The U.S. Navy's Communications Instructions of 1929 prescribed a different set of codes for the response: However, for joint Army-Navy operations, the K signal was replaced with the S signal, with exactly the same definitions.

1929 U.S. Navy readability responses
Response from receiving station	Meaning
R1	Unreadable
R2	Poor but readable—send each character twice.
R3	Fair—readable at slow speed, send code twice.
R4	Good—readable at moderate speed.
R5	Easily readable.

1929 U.S. Navy strength of signals responses
Response from receiving station	Meaning
K1	Very weak—hardly audible.
K2	Moderately weak.
K3	Medium strength.
K4	Moderately strong.
K5	Strong.

An expanded QRK code was first defined to go along with the earlier QSA code in the ITU Radio Regulations Cairo, 1938.

Request from first station	Response from receiving station	Meaning
QSA (replaced earlier QJS)	QSA1	Hardly perceptible, unreadable
QSA (replaced earlier QJS)	QSA2	Weak, readable now and then
QSA (replaced earlier QJS)	QSA3	Fairly good, readable but with difficulty
QSA (replaced earlier QJS)	QSA4	Good, readable
QSA (replaced earlier QJS)	QSA5	Very good, perfectly readable

Request from first station	Response from receiving station	Meaning
QRK	R1	Unreadable
QRK	R2	Occasional words distinguishable
QRK	R3	Readable with difficulty
QRK	R4	Readable with almost no difficulty
QRK	R5	Perfectly readable

=== FM 24-6 Radiotelegraph signal report format ===
The 1945 U.S. Army Radio Operator's Manual, FM 24-6 defines the radiotelegraph signal report format as follows:

Report	Readability	Signal Strength
1	Unreadable	Scarcely perceptible
2	Readable now and then	Weak
3	Readable but with difficulty	Fairly good
4	Readable	Good
5	Perfectly readable	Very good

FM 24-6 further states, "Readability and signal strength reports indicate the desired method of transmission and should be used in that sense. Readability and signal strength reports are not exchanged unless "3" or less, lack of any report being assumed to indicate satisfactory communications."

The report example given below uses military call signs and the obsolete Q Code of QJS for readability instead of the current QRK:

Station	Transmission
MB6	3MY V MB6 QJS 3 K
3MY	MB6 V 3MY I̅N̅T̅ QJS K
MB6	3MY V MB6 QJS 4 A̅R̅
MB6	S7P V MB6 INT QJS I̅N̅T̅ QSA K
S7P	MB6 V S7P QJS 3 QSA 3 A̅R̅

== CCB signal strength and readability ==
The 1943–1945 Combined Communications Board Publications, including CCBP 3-2: Combined Radiotelephone (R/T) Procedure, describe a slightly newer radiotelephony version of the radiotelegraph procedure described in the U.S. Army Radio Operator's Manual, FM 24-6:

(a) A station is understood to have good readability unless otherwise notified. Strength of signals and readability will not be exchanged unless one station cannot clearly hear another station.

(b) The response to "How do you hear me?" will be a short concise report of actual reception such as "Weak but readable," "Strong but distorted," "Loud and clear," "Strength Four," etc.

At least in CCBP 3–2, no additional detail is given about what the range of the numeric scale is, or the complete list of strength and readability code words are.

== See also ==
- Other signal reporting codes
  - Plain language radio checks
  - R-S-T system (for Amateur radio only)
  - SINPO code
  - Signal strength and readability report
  - Circuit Merit (for wired telephone circuits only)
