= Selcall =

Type of squelch protocol

SelCall
Example of a CCIR-format call.

11-tone SelCall with repeater opening
CCIR Selcall with repeater opening, 11-tone call and disconnect tone at the end.

Selcall (selective calling) is a type of squelch protocol used in radio communications systems, in which transmissions include a brief burst of sequential audio tones. Receivers that are set to respond to the transmitted tone sequence will open their squelch, while others will remain muted.

Selcall is a radio signalling protocol mainly in use in Europe, Asia, Australia and New Zealand, and continues to be incorporated in radio equipment marketed in those areas.

== Details ==
The transmission of a selcall code involves the generation and sequencing of a series of predefined, audible tones. Both the tone frequencies, and sometimes the tone periods, must be known in advance by both the transmitter and the receiver. Each predefined tone represents a single digit. A series of tones therefore represents a series of digits that represents a number. The number encoded in a selcall burst is used to address one or more receivers. If the receiver is programmed to recognise a certain number, then it will un-mute its speaker so that the transmission can be heard; an unrecognised number is ignored and therefore the receiver remains muted.

=== Tone Sets ===
Visualization of selcall tones

A selcall tone set contains 16 tones that represent 16 digits. The digits correspond to the 16 hexadecimal digits, i.e. 0-9 and A-F. Digits A-F are typically reserved for control purposes. For example, digit "E" is typically used as the repeat digit.

There are eight, well known, selcall tone sets.

Digit	CCIR	EEA	EIA	ZVEI I	ZVEI II	ZVEI III	DZVEI	PZVEI
0	1981 Hz	1981 Hz	600 Hz	2400 Hz	2400 Hz	2400 Hz	2200 Hz	2400 Hz
1	1124 Hz	1124 Hz	741 Hz	1060 Hz	1060 Hz	1060 Hz	970 Hz	1060 Hz
2	1197 Hz	1197 Hz	882 Hz	1160 Hz	1160 Hz	1160 Hz	1060 Hz	1160 Hz
3	1275 Hz	1275 Hz	1023 Hz	1270 Hz	1270 Hz	1270 Hz	1160 Hz	1270 Hz
4	1358 Hz	1358 Hz	1164 Hz	1400 Hz	1400 Hz	1400 Hz	1270 Hz	1400 Hz
5	1446 Hz	1446 Hz	1305 Hz	1530 Hz	1530 Hz	1530 Hz	1400 Hz	1530 Hz
6	1540 Hz	1540 Hz	1446 Hz	1670 Hz	1670 Hz	1670 Hz	1530 Hz	1670 Hz
7	1640 Hz	1640 Hz	1587 Hz	1830 Hz	1830 Hz	1830 Hz	1670 Hz	1830 Hz
8	1747 Hz	1747 Hz	1728 Hz	2000 Hz	2000 Hz	2000 Hz	1830 Hz	2000 Hz
9	1860 Hz	1860 Hz	1869 Hz	2200 Hz	2200 Hz	2200 Hz	2000 Hz	2200 Hz
A	2400 Hz	1055 Hz	2151 Hz	2800 Hz	885 Hz	885 Hz	825 Hz	970 Hz
B	930 Hz	930 Hz	2433 Hz	810 Hz	825 Hz	810 Hz	740 Hz	810 Hz
C	2247 Hz	2400 Hz	2010 Hz	970 Hz	740 Hz	2800 Hz	2600 Hz	2800 Hz
D	991 Hz	991 Hz	2292 Hz	885 Hz	680 Hz	680 Hz	885 Hz	885 Hz
E	2110 Hz	2110 Hz	459 Hz	2600 Hz	970 Hz	970 Hz	2400 Hz	2600 Hz
F	1055 Hz	2247 Hz	1091 Hz	680 Hz	2600 Hz	2600 Hz	680 Hz	680 Hz

=== Tone Periods ===
The physical characteristics of the transmitted sequence of tones is tightly controlled. Each tone is generated for a predefined period, in the order of tens of milliseconds. Each subsequent tone is transmitted immediately after the preceding one for the same period, until the sequence is complete.

Typical tone periods include; 20ms, 30ms (sometimes 33ms), 40ms, 50ms, 60ms, 70ms, 80ms, 90ms and 100ms.

The longer the tone period, the more reliable the decoding of the tone sequence. Naturally, the longer the tone period, the greater the duration of the selcall tone burst; longer bursts may be enough to force the user pause before speaking, especially if using the leading-edge ANI scheme.

A typical tone period selection is 40ms, so for a 5-tone sequence this represents a total selcall duration of 5 x 40ms = 200ms. However this is vendor specific and for example commercial radios from Ericsson uses a tone period selection of 100ms where the first tone is 700ms. The 700ms is used on the first tone and allows radios to run a tone scan on several channels without missing a call.

=== Repeat Tone ===
Each tone in a selcall sequence must be unique. Typically, the receiving device cannot discriminate between two consecutive tones, where the frequency of those two tones is the same; that is, two consecutive tones with the same frequency will be decoded as a single digit. Therefore, where there are two consecutive digits to be transmitted that are the same, the second digit will be replaced by the repeat digit. The repeat digit is nearly always assigned as "E". On reception, if the receiving device decodes a sequence that contains a repeat digit, then it will substitute it with the preceding digit, thereby reconstituting the original sequence.

For example; the sequence "12334" is actually transmitted as "123E4".

If a transmission would have multiple repeats, like "12333", it would be transmitted as "123E3" in order to not have the same problem again.

== Implementations ==
=== Automatic Number Identification ===
Automatic Number Identification or ANI, is a scheme that uses selcall for identification purposes. Typically a mobile radio will be configured to transmit a preconfigured selcall sequence when the user presses the ‘push-to-talk’ (PTT) button, which will automatically identify them to other devices listening on the same frequency on the radio network.

There are two ANI schemes; leading-edge and trailing-edge. Leading-edge ANI will transmit the selcall sequence as soon as the user presses the PTT button. Trailing-edge ANI will transmit the selcall sequence as soon as the user releases the PTT button.

Some selcall implementations use the last digit in the selcall sequence to signify some sort of status or condition, for example emergency or duress. Both transmitting and receiving devices are configured such that they attribute the same significance to each of the status codes. Often a device that decodes a certain status can display a predefined message to alert the user.

Together, ANI and status provide a convenient way to rapidly relay information via the radio network, without the user having to speak. For example, an ambulance paramedic in the field, having encountered some emergency, can simply press and release the PTT button on their radio to signal their predicament to the base. The ANI will identify the caller, the status code will indicate the scenario and the base can dispatch assistance as required.

=== Status Gap ===
A variation on selcall transmission that includes a status code is for the transmitting device to insert one or two tone periods of silence between the preceding tones and the status tone; the so-called status gap. Another variation is to prolong the status tone by another tone period; the so-called two tone-period status tone.

== Proprietary Implementations ==
Motorola's name is Select 5 in sales brochures for obsolete equipment marketed in Europe such as Syntor mobiles, Syntor X mobiles, Mitrek mobiles, Mostar mobiles, and Maxar mobiles.

=== As push-to-talk identifier ===
Modat
Example of simulated pick up and delivery truck radio traffic using Modat unit ID.

A similar proprietary Motorola format used a seven-tone sequence and was called MODAT. Radios with this option were marketed in the US during the 1970s and 1980s. MODAT encoders in Motorola radios can be configured to send five-tone sequences with code plans compatible to CCIR, ZVEI, or the proprietary Motorola seven-tone-sequential format. These systems send tone sequences to identify a unit (unit ID) rather than for selective calling. Some systems used CTCSS and MODAT. In a unit ID application, every radio has a different five- or seven-tone code. Each time the push-to-talk is pressed, the tone sequence is transmitted. This code is displayed at the dispatch console to identify which unit has called. In some cases the code is translated to a vehicle number or other identifier.
