= 16-line message format =

NATO radiogram format

16-line message format, or Basic Message Format, is the NATO standard military radiogram format for the manner in which a paper message form is transcribed through voice, Morse code, or Teletypewriter transmission formats. The overall structure of the message has three parts: HEADING (which can use as many as 10 of the format's 16 lines), TEXT (line 12), and ENDING. This heading is further divided into procedure, preamble, address, and prefix. Each format line contains pre-defined content. An actual message may have fewer than 16 actual lines, or far more than 16, because some lines are skipped in some delivery methods, and a long message may have a TEXT portion that is longer than 16 lines by itself.

This radiotelegraph message format (also "radio teletype message format", "teletypewriter message format", and "radiotelephone message format") and transmission procedures have been documented in numerous military standards, going back to at least World War II-era U.S. Army manuals.

== Historical Development ==
- U.S. Army Field Manual FM 24-5 Basic Field Manual, Signal Communication
- U.S. Army Field Manual FM 24-17 Tactical Communications Center Operations
- U.S. Army Field Manual FM-24-19 Radio Operator's Handbook (Chapter 5: Operating Procedures)
- Messages were formerly prepared on DD Form 173/4, Joint Message Form
- DD Form 1753, Master Station Log would be used to record some types of data for the radio station.
- DD Form 1765, Incoming Service Message Log would be used to record received messages.
- DD Form 1766, Outgoing Service Message Log would be used to record outgoing messages.

== Current Definition and Usage ==
The 16-line format and procedures for transmitting it vary slightly depending on the communications medium, but all variations are designed to be harmonious and the procedures describe how to convert (refile) between the formats.

- ACP-124 (messages relayed by telegraphy)
- ACP-125 defines the format of messages relayed by voice
- ACP-126 defines the format of messages relayed by radio teletype
- ACP-127 defines the format of messages relayed by automated tape
- Military Affiliate Radio Service

== Example Messages ==
When sent as an ACP-126 message over teletype, a 16-line format radiogram would appear similar to this:

RFHT
DE RFG NR 114
R 151412Z MAR
FM CG FIFTH CORPS
TO CG THIRD INFDIV
WD GRNC
BT
UNCLAS
PLAINDRESS SINGLE ADDRESS
MESSAGES WILL BE TRANSMITTED
OVER TELETIPEWRITER CIRCUITS
AS INDICATED IN THIS EXAMPLE
BT
C WA OVER TELETYPEWRITER
NNNN

Some of the format lines in the above example have been omitted for efficiency. The translation of this abbreviate format follows:

Format Line	Message Text	Explanation
Line 2	RFHT	Station being called, which will receive the message
Line 3	DE RFG NR 114	Sent by radio station having the callsign RFG, station serial number 114
Line 5	R 151412Z MAR	Routine precedence, March 15, 2:12pm UTC in Date-time group format
Line 6	FM CG FIFTH CORPS	The message is from CG FIFTH CORPS
Line 7	TO CG THIRD INFDIV	The message is to CG THIRD INFDIV
Line 10	WD GRNC	Accounting symbol (WD); word groups have not been counted (GRNC)
Line 11	BT	Section separator between heading and text
Line 12	UNCLAS PLAINDRESS SINGLE ADDRESS MESSAGES WILL BE TRANSMITTED OVER TELETIPEWRITER CIRCUITS AS INDICATED IN THIS EXAMPLE	Message content is unclassified, and the message is sent with a misspelled word, "TELETIPEWRITER" for example purposes.
Line 13	BT	Section separator between text and the ending
Line 15	C WA OVER TELETYPEWRITER	corrects (C) word after (WA) "OVER" to "TELETYPEWRITER"
Line 16	NNNN	end-of-message indicator

Example message in four different formats:

Format Line	Telegraph Radiogram (ACP-124)	Voice Radiogram (ACP-125)	Radioteletype Radiogram (ACP-126)	Tape Relay Radiogram (ACP-127)	ACP-127 Supl.
1			VZCZC051 UU	VZCZC051 UU	VZCZC051 UU
2 (or 2&3)		CALLED_CALLSIGN THIS IS CALLING_CALLSIGN MESSAGE NUMBER 051	CALLED_CALLSIGN DE CALLING_CALLSIGN NR 051	RR CALLED_CALLSIGN	RR CALLED_CALLSIGN
3				DE CALLING_CALLSIGN 0051 22/1856Z	DE CALLING_CALLSIGN #0051 1121857
4			TRANSMISSION INSTRUCTIONS/OP. SIGS	ZNR UUUUU TRANSMISSION INSTRUCTIONS/OP. SIGS	ZNR UUUUU TRANSMISSION INSTRUCTIONS/OP. SIGS
5		ROUTINE TIME 221855Z APR 2015	R 221855Z APR 2015	R 221856Z APR 2015	R 221857Z APR 2015
6		FROM ORIGINATION PLAIN LANGUAGE ADDRESS	FM ORIGINATION PLAIN LANGUAGE ADDRESS	FM ORIGINATION PLAIN LANGUAGE ADDRESS	FM ORIGINATION PLAIN LANGUAGE ADDRESS
7		TO TO ADDRESSEE RI AND PLAD	TO TO ADDRESSEE RI AND PLAD	TO TO ADDRESSEE RI AND PLAD	TO TO ADDRESSEE RI AND PLAD
8		INFO INFORMATION ADDRESSEE 1 RI AND PLAD; INFORMATION ADDRESSEE 2 RI AND PLAD	INFO INFORMATION ADDRESSEE 1 RI AND PLAD; INFORMATION ADDRESSEE 2 RI AND PLAD	INFO INFORMATION ADDRESSEE 1 RI AND PLAD; INFORMATION ADDRESSEE 2 RI AND PLAD	INFO INFORMATION ADDRESSEE 1 RI AND PLAD; INFORMATION ADDRESSEE 2 RI AND PLAD
9					
10		GROUP NO COUNT			
11		BREAK	BT	BT	BT
12		UNCLASSIFIED; THIS IS A TEST MESSAGE	UNCLAS; THIS IS A TEST MESSAGE	UNCLAS; THIS IS A TEST MESSAGE	UNCLAS; THIS IS A TEST MESSAGE
13		BREAK	BT	BT	BT
14					
15					#0051
16		OVER	NNNN	NNNN	NNNN

=== Historical Development ===
The concept of the standard message format originated in the wired telegraph services. Each telegraph company likely had its own format, but soon after radio telegraph services began, some elements of the message exchange format were codified in international conventions (such as Articles 9, 22, 26, 29, 30, and Appendix 1 of the International Radiotelegraph Convention, Washington, 1927), and these were then often duplicated in domestic radio communications regulations (such as the FCC in the U.S.) and in military procedure documentation.

Military organizations independently developed their own procedures, and in addition to differing from the international procedures, they sometimes differed between different branches of the military within the same country.

For example, the publication "Communication Instructions, 1929", from the U.S. Navy Department, includes:

- One procedure for messages transmitted "in naval form over nonnaval systems" (Part II: Radio, Chapter 15)
- One procedure for exchanging messages with commercial radio stations (Part II: Radio, Chapter 16, pages 36–37 for examples; see also Part I: Chapter 7)
- One procedure for messages transmitted within the Navy (Part IV: Procedure and Examples, Chapter 32, especially pages 21 & 22 for the format)
- One format for exchanging messages between the Army and Navy (Part IV: Appendix A), called the "Joint Army and Navy Radiotelegraph Procedure", with the format shown on page 70.

== Sources for Procedures ==
Technical Manuals

- TM 1-460 (Radiotelephone Procedure, Air Corps 1941)
- TM 11-454 (The Radio Operator)
- TM 11-455 (Radio Fundamentals)
- 11-486-2 Traffic.
- 11-486-3 Transmission and Circuit Layout.
- TM 11-490 (Army Communications Facilities: Autodin Station and Teletypewriter Station Operating Procedures)
- TM 11-490-2 (Army Communications Facilities: Telecommunications Center Operating Procedures)

Field Manuals

- FM 11-8 (Field Radio Relay Techniques)
- FM 11-9 (Signal Radio Relay Company)
- FM 11-23 (U.S. Army Strategic Communications Command (Theater))
- Army Subject Schedules (ASubjScd) 11-23 Teletype Communications.
- Army Subject Schedules (ASubjScd) 11-24 Telephone Central Office Communications
- Army Subject Schedules (ASubjScd) 11-36 Radiotelephone Operations
- FM 11-50 (Combat Communications Within the Division)
- FM 11-57 (Signal Battalion, Airborne Division)
- FM 11-65 (High Frequency Radio Communications)
- FM 11-84 Signal Radio Operations Company.
- FM 11-86 (Combat Area Signal Battalion, Army)
- Fm 11-92 (Corps Signal Battalion)
- FM 11-95 (Army Signal Battalion; radio nets, field army tactical operations center, etc.)
- FM 11-125 (Field Army Signal Communications)
- FM 11-117 (Signal Support Company)
- FM 11-127 Signal Medium Headquarters Operations Company
- FM 11-137 (Signal Communications Center Operation Company)
- FM 11-147 Signal Small Headquarters, Operations Company
- FM 11-490-7 (Military Affiliate Radio System)
- FM 24-1 (Combat Communications, signal communications training; Tactical Communications Doctrine)
- FM 24-5 (Basic Field Manual, Signal Communication),
- FM 24-6 (Radio Operator's Manual, Army Ground Forces)
- FM 24-9 (Combined United States-British Radiotelephone (R/T) Procedure)
- FM 24-10 (Combined Radiotelegraph (W/T) Procedure)
- FM 24-11 (Combined Operating Signals)
- FM 24-16 (Communications-Electronics: Operations, Orders, Records and Reports)
- FM 24-18 (Radio Communication)
- FM 24-21 Field Radio Relay Techniques
- FM 24-35 (Communications-Electronics Operation Instructions)
- FM 100-11 (Signal Communications Doctrine)
- FM 100-34-1 (Tactics, Techniques, and Procedures for Command Post Operations)
- FM 101-5-2 (U.S. Army Report and Message Formats)—The US Army's doctrinal library for report and message voice templates

Tables of Organization and Equipment (TOE)

- 11-122 Headquarters and Headquarters Detachment, Signal Group.
- 11-127 Signal Operations Company, Medium Headquarters.
- 11-137 Signal Communication Center Operation Company.
- 11-147 Signal Small Headquarters Operations Company.
- 11-303 Signal Radio Operations Company.
- 11-327 Signal Operations Company, Large Headquarters.
- 11-345 Signal Operations Battalion.
- 11-347 Signal Long Lines Company.
- 11-357 Signal Truck Switching Company.
- 11-358 Signal Messenger Company.
- 11-367 Signal Company, Tropospheric, Light.
- 11-368 Signal Company, Tropospheric, Heavy.
- 11-317 Signal Radio Relay Company.

Army Regulations

- AR 25-6 (Military Auxiliary Radio System)
- AR 25-11 (Record Communications and the Privacy Communications System)
- AR 105-10 (Communications Economy and Discipline)
- AR 105-31 (Record Communications)
- AR 105-64 (US Army Communications Electronics Operation Instructions (CEOI) Program)
- AR 105-75 (Military Auxiliary Radio System; replaced by AR 25-6)
- Navy Department Communication Instructions 1929
- AR 310-50 (Authorized Abbreviations, Brevity Codes, and Acronyms)

Forms

- DA FORM 4158 (Circuit Log and Operator’s Number Sheet)
- DA PAM 310-1 (Consolidated Index of Army Publications and Blank Forms)

Training Material

- PS 6-79 (Purpose and operational principles of the message center)
- 1-3310 1943 (Radio Operator)
- TF 11-2061 (Use of Voice Radio)
- FS 11-66 (Forms, records, and equipment)
- PS 6-81 (Incoming messages, how to handle)
- PS 6-80 (Outgoing messages)
- MF 11-2487 (Radio Interference—Part I)
- MF 11-2488 (Radio Interference—Part II)
- MF 11-4573 (Radiotelephone Procedures)
- MF 11-4359 (Single Side Band Radio Communications, Part I: Principles)
- MF 11-4362 (Single Side Band Radio Communications, Part II: Techniques)
- TVT 11-109 (Radio Interference - Causes and Sounds)
- TVT 11-110 (Radio Interference: Remedial Action and Reporting)
- TVT 11-6300 (Net Controller Training, Part I)
- TVT 11-6301 (Net Controller Training, Part II)
- 113-571-1003 (Communicate in a Radio Net)
- 113-572-1002 (Send a Message in 16-Line Format)
- TF 11-671 (Message Center Procedures for Division and Higher Headquarters; Part I, Outgoing Messages)
- TF 11-1064 (Message Center Procedures for Division and Higher Headquarters; Part II, Incoming Messages)

And their modern decedents in the Allied Communications Procedures

- ACP-131 (Communication Instructions—Operating Signals)
- U.S. Navy Signalman training courses

Training for message handling may (or may not) be found listed in the following documents:

- DOD Regulations and Manuals (DOD)
- DOD 5040.2-C-1 Catalog of Audiovisual Productions—Army
- DOD 5040.2-C-2 Catalog of Audiovisual Productions—Navy and Marine Corps
- DOD 5040.2-C-3 Catalog of Audiovisual Productions—Air Force and Miscellaneous DOD Productions
- DOD 5040.2-C-4 Catalog of Audiovisual Productions—DOD Productions Cleared for Public Release

== See also ==
- Allied Communication Procedures
