= SINPO code =

Brevity code for radio signal reports

SINPO, an acronym for Signal, Interference, Noise, Propagation, and Overall, is a Signal Reporting Code used to describe the quality of broadcast and radiotelegraph transmissions. SINPFEMO, an acronym for Signal, Interference, Noise, Propagation, frequency of Fading, dEpth, Modulation, and Overall is used to describe the quality of radiotelephony transmissions. SINPFEMO code consists of the SINPO code plus the addition of three letters to describe additional features of radiotelephony transmissions. These codes are defined by Recommendation ITU-R Sm.1135, SINPO and SINPFEMO codes.

SINPO code is most frequently used in reception reports written by shortwave listeners. Each letter of the code stands for a specific factor of the signal, and each item is graded on a 1 to 5 scale (where 1 indicates nearly undetectable/severe/unusable and 5 indicates excellent/nil/extremely strong).

The code originated with the CCIR (a predecessor to the ITU-R) in 1951, and was widely used by BBC shortwave listeners to submit signal reports, with many going so far as to mail audio recordings to the BBC's offices.

SINPO and SINPFEMO are the official signal reporting codes for international civil aviation and ITU-R.

The use of the SINPO code can be subjective and may vary from person to person. Not all shortwave listeners are conversant with the SINPO code and prefer using plain language instead.

== SINPO code explained ==
S (Signal strength)
The relative strength of the transmission.
I (Interference)
Interference from other stations on the same or adjacent frequencies.
N (Noise)
The amount of atmospheric or man-made noise.
P (Propagation)
Whether the signal is steady or fades from time to time.
O (Overall merit)
An overall score for the listening experience under these conditions.

Each category is rated from 1 to 5, with 1 being unusable or severe and 5 being perfect or nil. A higher number always indicates a better result. Where signal and overall merit are graded in terms of strength (where 1 is the lowest and 5 is the highest), interference, noise and propagation are graded in the opposite way – their degrading effect is measured. For example, a 5 for signal strength represents a very strong signal, but a 5 for noise indicates very little noise.

Many raters misunderstand the code and will rate everything either 55555 or 11111 when in reality, both extremes are unusual in the extreme. 55555 essentially means perfect reception akin to a local station while that is occasionally possible, when talking about long-distance short-wave reception, it is rarely the case.

Another common mistake in rating is presenting an O rating higher than any previously rated element. By definition, a reading cannot present perfect reception if there is any noise or interference or fading present. In other words, it cannot be considered perfect local quality reception if any of those things are present.

ITU-R SINPO Code
Rating scale	S	I	N	P	O
Rating scale		Degrading effect of			
Rating scale	Signal strength	Interference	Noise	Propagation disturbance	Overall rating
5	Excellent	Nil	Nil	Nil	Excellent
4	Good	Slight	Slight	Slight	Good
3	Fair	Moderate	Moderate	Moderate	Fair
2	Poor	Severe	Severe	Severe	Poor
1	Barely audible	Extreme	Extreme	Extreme	Unusable

== SINPFEMO code ==
An extension of SINPO code, for use in radiotelephony (voice over radio) communications, SINPFEMO is an acronym for Signal, Interference, Noise, Propagation, frequency of Fading, dEpth, Modulation, and Overall.

ITU-R SINPEMFO Code
Rating scale	S	I	N	P	F	E	M	O
Rating scale		Degrading effect of			Frequency of fading	Modulation		
Rating scale	Signal strength	Interference	Noise	Propagation disturbance	Frequency of fading	Quality	Depth	Overall rating
5	Excellent	Nil	Nil	Nil	Nil	Excellent	Maximum	Excellent
4	Good	Slight	Slight	Slight	Slow	Good	Good	Good
3	Fair	Moderate	Moderate	Moderate	Moderate	Fair	Fair	Fair
2	Poor	Severe	Severe	Severe	Fast	Poor	Poor or Nil	Poor
1	Barely audible	Extreme	Extreme	Extreme	Very fast	Very Poor	Continuously over-modulated	Unusable

== Examples of SINPO code applied ==
In responding to a shortwave reception, the SINPO indicates to the transmitting station the overall quality of the reception.

The SINPO code in normal use consists of the 5 rating numbers listed without the letters, as in the examples below:

- 54554 – This indicates a relatively clear reception, with only slight interference; however, nothing that would significantly degrade the listening experience.
- 33433 – This indicates a signal which is moderately strong, but has more interference, and therefore deterioration of the received signal.

Generally, a SINPO with a code number starting with a 2 or lower would not be worth reporting, unless there is no noise, interference or loss of propagation, since it would be likely the signal would be unintelligible.

Although the original SINPO code established technical specifications for each number (i.e., a number 3 in the P column meant a fixed number of fades per minute), these are rarely adhered to by reporters. The 'S' meter displays the relative strength of the received RF signal in decibels; however, this should not be used as the sole indication of signal strength, as no two S meters are calibrated exactly alike, and many lower-priced receivers omit the S meter altogether. References to a "SINFO" code may also be found in some literature. In this case, the 'F' stands for Fading, instead of 'P' for Propagation, but the two codes are interchangeable. It was presumed that the average listener would be more familiar with the meaning of "fading" than "propagation". A simple way to ensure the rating applied is useful is to rate the "O" column first based on the intelligibility of the station. If you can understand everything easily, the station will rate a 4 or higher. If you have to work hard, but can understand everything '3' is the appropriate rating. If you cannot understand everything although you put great effort into it, a '2' is appropriate, and if you cannot understand the programming at all '1' is the appropriate rating.

Some listeners may not know how to distinguish between the 'I' which indicates interference from adjacent stations, and the 'N' which describes natural atmospheric or man-made noise; also for some listeners, the rating for 'Propagation' may not be completely understood. As a result of this confusion, many stations suggest the SIO code – a simpler code which makes the limitations noted above not relevant. Despite this, some books and periodicals maintain the SINPO code is the best for DX reporters.

== History ==
SINPO is said to have evolved from the BBC's RAISO format (full version: RAFISBEMVO, which measured:

BBC signal reporting code
Letter	Property
R	carrieR strength
A	fAding (Depth)
F	Fading (Frequency)
I	Interference
S	Static
B	Background noise
E	transmitted noisE
M	Modulation (degree)
V	modulation (duality)
O	Overall rating

== See also ==
- Plain language radio checks
- QSA and QRK code (for Morse code only)
- R-S-T system (for Amateur radio only)
- Signal strength and readability report
- Circuit Merit (for wired and wireless telephone circuits only, not radiotelephony)
- QSL card
