= Circuit Merit =

Computed telephone line quality measure

The Circuit Merit system is a measurement process designed to assess the voice-to-noise ratio in wired and wireless telephone circuits, especially the AMPS system, and although its reporting scale is sometimes used as input for calculating mean opinion score, the rating system is officially defined relative to given ranges of voice-to-noise ratios.

Various technical sources state that experimental research varies in what ratio is required for good understanding, but is typically above 20 dB, and noticeably higher reports of voice quality can be achieved when the ratio is near 30 dB.

There are 5 levels of quality, detailed as follows:

Circuit Merit	Label	Definition	Nominal Value (speech-to-noise ratio)	Range
CM5	Excellent	Perfectly readable, negligible noise.	--	>30 dB
CM4	Good	Perfectly readable but with noticeable noise.	22 dB	16 to 30 dB
CM3	Fair	Readable with only occasional repetition (commercial).	12 dB	9 to 16 dB
CM2	Poor	Readable with difficulty, requires frequent repetition (noncommercial).	7 dB	5 to 9 dB
CM1	Unsatisfactory	Unusable, presence of speech barely discernible.	--	<5 dB

Measurement of audio speech-to-noise ratios in a way which reflects interfering effects in a meaningful manner is difficult for the kinds of noise often encountered at mobile system receivers. For this reason and as a matter of convenience, a subjective rating of the interfering effect of the noise using the term “circuit merit” is commonly used in place of metered measurements. This method uses a scale of five steps to describe performance. These are listed and defined in the above table. The speech-to-noise ratios in dB included in this table are arbitrary numbers which apply if both speech and noise are measured on either a 2B noise measuring set with F1A line weighting or a 3A noise measuring set with C-message weighting. In making such measurements, noise is measured in the normal manner and speech volume is read by the method used with a VU meter.

Circuit Merit 3 is generally regarded as the minimum acceptable for public mobile telephone service, and is used as a basis for drawing coverage boundaries. Where necessary, CM2 may be found tolerable for occasional calls, but this grade of transmission is clearly unsuitable as a service offering. In typical service areas so defined, users will experience transmission as poor as CM3 only when the mobile station is situated near the fringes of the area. They will enjoy better transmission throughout the bulk of the coverage area and, as a usual consequence, on most of their calls. Situations in which fringe coverage areas pass through important localities heavily frequented by local mobile stations should be avoided since users may not find CM3 agreeable if experienced on any large proportion of their calls.

== Delivered Audio Quality ==
For use on digital voice telephone systems, the DAQ reference is used. This differs from Circuit Merit in that it adds definitions for digitized voice and a static SINAD for multipath fading, using levels described in TIA/EIA TSB-88-A.

Delivered Audio Quality	Definition
DAQ 5	Speech easily understood.
DAQ 4.5	Speech easily understood. Infrequent Noise/Distortion.
DAQ 4	Speech easily understood. Occasional Noise/Distortion.
DAQ 3.4	Speech understandable with repetition only rarely required. Some Noise/Distortion.
DAQ 3	Speech understandable with slight effort. Occasional repetition due to Noise/Distortion.
DAQ 2	Understandable with considerable effort. Frequent repetition due to Noise/Distortion.
DAQ 1	Unusable. Speech present but not understandable.

== History ==
The Circuit Merit system was developed early in the 20th Century by AT&T to quantifiably measure voice quality on the PSTN, and later adapted to include wireless telephone circuits, such as the early MTS (which was first used in 1947), IMTS and the later cellular telephone system (field trials date from 1976). It is intended to be used on a statistical basis, by collecting multiple data points (either subjective scores by human listeners, or by electronic measurements), to then produce a comprehensive report on the circuit quality. The system does not include any provision for reporting RF signal strength, and is thus inappropriate for routine use on non-telephone voice radio systems.

Circuit merit is specifically designed to report the signal-to-noise ratio of a communications circuit, preferably by use of electronic test equipment. See also Figure of Merit

The Circuit Merit system is also used mistakenly by some amateur radio operators unfamiliar with its origins to overcome perceived inadequacies in using the R-S-T System. This belief is contrary to the published description of the R-S-T System (which uses the same number of levels for readability), and of modern (as of 2006) requirement "...that plain language be used for multi-agency, multi-jurisdiction and multi-discipline events, such as major disasters and exercises..." instead of numeric codes in radio traffic in NIMS/ICS. As both Circuit Merit and the R-S-T System use numbers that are often difficult for operators to map to meanings, neither complies with the intent of the NIMS plain language directive.

There is at least one plain-language voice and signal strength reporting system that does meet the NIMS plain language directive—the Plain Language Radio Checks as described in section 611 of Allied Communications Procedure 125(F): Radio Checks, Signal Strength, and Readability. The best-possible radio check report possible under this system, "LOUD AND CLEAR", is commonly used in film, television, and literature depictions of radio communications.

== See also ==
- Absolute Category Rating
- MOS Mean Opinion Score
- Perceptual Evaluation of Speech Quality (PESQ)
- Perceptual Objective Listening Quality Analysis (POLQA)
- Plain Language Radio Checks
- QSA and QRK code (for Morse code only)
- R-S-T system (for Amateur radio only)
- Signal strength and readability report
- SINPO code
