= Operating signals =

Signals for management of telegraph circuits

Operating signals are a type of brevity code used in operational communication among radio and telegraph operators. For example:

- Prosigns for Morse code
- 92 Code: telegraph brevity codes
- Q code: initially developed for commercial radiotelegraph communication and adopted by other radio services
- QN Signals: published by the ARRL and used in Amateur radio
- R and S brevity codes: published by the British Post Office in 1908 for coastal wireless stations and ships, superseded in 1912 by Q codes
- X code: used by European military services in wireless telegraphy
- Z code: used in early radiotelegraph communication

== See also ==
- Brevity code
- SINPO code - code used to describe the quality of radio transmissions, especially in reception reports written by shortwave listeners
- R-S-T system- information about the quality of a radio signal being received. Used by amateur radio operators, shortwave listeners.
- Morse code abbreviations
- Telegraphese
