= CCIR (selcall) =

There are many types and formats of CCIR Selcall. For example, CCIR 493-4 is a standard format for HF Selcall for Land Mobile applications. CCIR (Consultative Committee on International Radio) functions have largely been taken over by ITU-R. One common type of CCIR selcall used in VHF and UHF FM two-way radio communications, is a 5-tone selective calling system mainly found in some European countries and used by the Swedish Police and the Turkish Police.

The tone duration of a 5 tone CCIR selcall is 100 milliseconds (± 10 ms) and the tones are transmitted sequentially.

CCIR tone frequencies
Value	Frequency
1	1124 Hz
2	1197 Hz
3	1275 Hz
4	1358 Hz
5	1446 Hz
6	1540 Hz
7	1640 Hz
8	1747 Hz
9	1860 Hz
0	1981 Hz
Group (A)	2400 Hz
Repeat (E)	2110 Hz
