= R-S-T system =

Brevity code for Ham radio signal reports

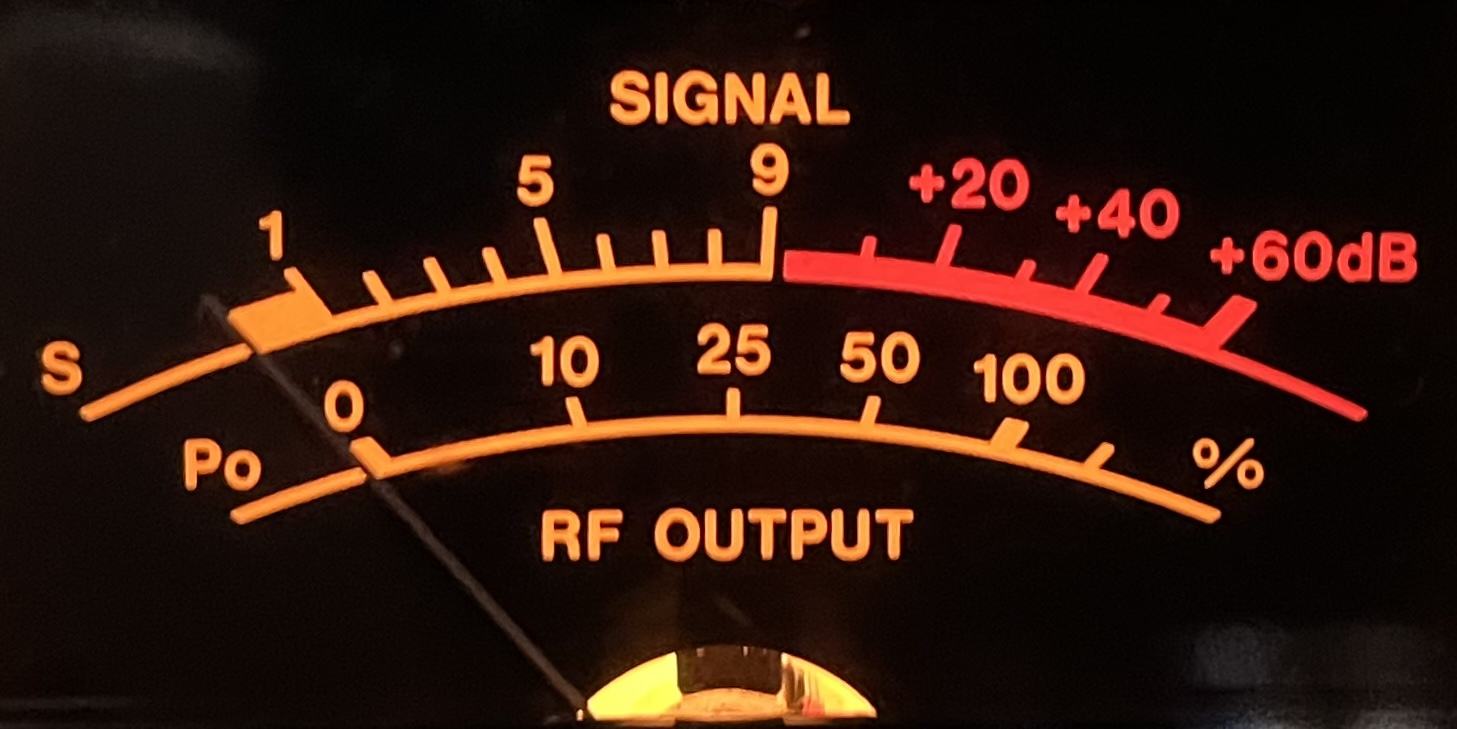
S-Meter (on upper scale on an ICOM IC-732 HF Transceiver)

The R-S-T system is used by amateur radio operators, shortwave listeners, and other radio hobbyists to exchange information about the quality of a radio signal being received. The code is a three digit number, with one digit each for conveying an assessment of the signal's readability, strength, and tone. The code was developed in 1934 by amateur radio operator Arthur W. Braaten, W2BSR, and was similar to that codified in the ITU Radio Regulations, Cairo, 1938.

== Readability ==
The R stands for "Readability". Readability is a qualitative assessment of how easy or difficult it is to correctly copy the information being sent during the transmission. In a Morse code telegraphy transmission, readability refers to how easy or difficult it is to distinguish each of the characters in the text of the message being sent; in a voice transmission, readability refers to how easy or difficult it is for each spoken word to be understood correctly. Readability is measured on a scale of 1 to 5.

1. Unreadable
2. Barely readable, occasional words distinguishable
3. Readable with considerable difficulty
4. Readable with practically no difficulty
5. Perfectly readable

== Strength ==
The S stands for "Strength". Strength is an assessment of how powerful the received signal is at the receiving location. Although an accurate signal strength meter can determine a quantitative value for signal strength, in practice this portion of the RST code is a qualitative assessment, often made based on the S meter of the radio receiver at the location of signal reception. "Strength" is measured on a scale of 1 to 9.

1. Faint—signals barely perceptible
2. Very weak signals
3. Weak signals
4. Fair signals
5. Fairly good signals
6. Good signals
7. Moderately strong signals
8. Strong signals
9. Extremely strong signals

For a quantitative assessment, quality HF receivers are calibrated so that S9 on the S-meter corresponds to a signal of 50 μV at the antenna standard terminal impedance 50 ohms. One "S" difference should correspond to 6 dB at signal strength (2x voltage = 4x power). On VHF and UHF receivers used for weak signal communications, S9 often corresponds to 5 μV at the antenna terminal 50 ohms. Amateur radio (ham) operators may also use a signal strength of "20 to 60 over 9", or "+20 to +60 over 9." This is in reference to a signal that exceeds S9 on a signal meter on a HF receiver.

== Tone ==
The T stands for "Tone" and is measured on a scale of 1 to 9. Tone only pertains to Morse code and other digital transmission modes and is therefore omitted during voice operations. With modern technology, imperfections in the quality of transmitters’ digital modulation severe enough to be detected by human ears are rare.

Value	1936 definition	modern definition
1	Extremely rough hissing note	60 Hz AC or less, very rough and broad
2	Very rough AC note, no trace of musicality	Very rough AC, very harsh and broad
3	Rough, low-pitched AC note, slightly musical	Rough AC tone, rectified but not filtered
4	Rather rough AC note, moderately musical	Rough note, some trace of filtering
5	Musically modulated note	Filtered rectified AC but strongly ripple-modulated
6	Modulated note, slight trace of whistle	Filtered tone, definite trace of ripple modulation
7	Near DC note, smooth ripple	Near pure tone, trace of ripple modulation
8	Good DC note, just a trace of ripple	Near perfect tone, slight trace of modulation
9	Purest DC note	Perfect tone, no trace of ripple or modulation of any kind
If there are other notable tonal qualities add one or more of the letters A–X, listed below, after the number.

Suffixes were historically added to indicate other signal properties, and might be sent as 599K to indicate a clear, strong signal but with bothersome key clicks.

Suffix code	Meaning
A	signal distorted by auroral propagation
C	"chirp" (frequency shift at key-on or key-off)
D	"drift" (frequency wandering)
K	key clicks
M	signal distorted by multipath propagation
S	signal distorted by scatter propagation
X	exceptionally stable frequency (crystal control)

== Variations ==
An example RST report for a voice transmission is "59", usually pronounced "five nine" or "five by nine", a report that indicates a perfectly readable and very strong signal. Exceptionally strong signals are designated by the quantitative number of decibels, in excess of "S9", displayed on the receiver's S meter. Example: "Your signal is 30 dB over S9," or more simply, "Your signal is 30 over 9."

Because the N character in Morse code requires less time to send than the 9, during amateur radio contests where the competing amateur radio stations are all using Morse code, the nines in the RST are typically abbreviated to N to read 5NN. In general, this practice is referred to as abbreviated or "cut" numbers.

The RSQ system has also been proposed for digital modes as an alternative to the RST system. The Q replaces "Tone" with "Quality" on a similar 1-9 scale indicating presence or number of unwanted 'sidebar pairs' in a narrow-band digital mode, such as PSK31 or RTTY.

== See also ==
- Plain Language Radio Checks
- QSA and QRK code (for Morse code only)
- SINPO
- Signal strength and readability report
- Circuit Merit (for wired and wireless telephone circuits only, not radiotelephony)
- QSL card
- R-S-M-Q, A Standard Method of Reporting for Telephony, A. M. Braaten, T. & R. Bulletin 1936
