= Signal strength and readability report =

Quality rating of radio communications

A signal strength and readability report is a standardized format for reporting the strength of the radio signal and the readability (quality) of the radiotelephone (voice) or radiotelegraph (Morse code) signal transmitted by another station as received at the reporting station's location and by their radio station equipment. These report formats are usually designed for only one communications mode or the other, although a few are used for both telegraph and voice communications. All but one of these signal report formats involve the transmission of numbers.

== History ==
As the earliest radio communication used Morse code, all radio signal reporting formats until about the 1920s were for radiotelegraph, and the early voice radio signal report formats were based on the telegraph report formats.

=== Timeline of signal report formats ===
- The first signal report format code may have been QJS.
- The U.S. Navy used R and K signals starting in 1929.
- The QSK code was one of the twelve Q Codes listed in the 1912 International Radiotelegraph Convention Regulations, but may have been in use earlier.
- The QSA code was included in the Madrid Convention (Appendix 10, General Regulations) sometime prior to 1936.
- The Amateur radio R-S-T system signal report format currently in use was first developed in 1934.
- As early as 1943, the U.S and UK military published the first guidance that included the modern "Weak but readable", "Strong but distorted", and "Loud and clear" phrases.
- By 1951, the CCEB had published ACP 125(A) (a.k.a. SGM-1O82-51), which formalized the 1943 "Loud and clear" format.

== Radiotelegraph report formats ==
=== Q-Code signal report formats ===
The QSA code and QRK code are interrelated and complementary signal reporting codes for use in wireless telegraphy (Morse code). They replaced the earlier QSJ code.

Currently, the QSA and QRK codes are officially defined in the ITU Radio Regulations 1990, Appendix 13: Miscellaneous Abbreviations and Signals to Be Used in Radiotelegraphy Communications Except in the Maritime Mobile Service. They are also described identically in ACP131(F),:

ITU-R Radiotelegraph Signal Reporting Formats
Signal	Question	Answer, Advice, or Order
QSA	What is the strength of my signals (or those of...)?	The strength of your signals (or those of...) is...: 1. scarcely perceptible 2. weak 3. fairly good 4. good 5. very good
QRK	What is the intelligibility of my signals (or those of...)?	The intelligibility of your signals (or those of...) is...: 1. bad 2. poor 3. fair 4. good 5. excellent

=== R-S-T system ===
Amateur radio users in the U.S. and Canada have used the R-S-T system since 1934. This system was developed by amateur radio operator Arthur W. Braaten, W2BSR. It reports the readability on a scale of 1 to 5, the signal strength on a scale of 1 to 9, and the tone of the Morse code continuous wave signal on a scale of 1 to 9. During amateur radio contests, where the rate of new contacts is paramount, contest participants often give a perfect signal report of 599 even when the signal is lower quality, because always providing the same signal format enables them to send Morse code with less thought and thus increased speed.

ARRL R-S-T System
No.	Meaning		
No.	R	S	T
9		Extremely strong signals	Perfect tone, no trace of ripple or modulation of any kind
8		Strong signals	Near perfect tone, slight trace of modulation
7		Moderately strong signals	Near pure tone, trace of ripple modulation
6		Good signals	Filtered tone, definite trace of ripple modulation
5	Perfectly readable	Fairly good signals	Filtered rectified a.c. but strongly ripple-modulated
4	Readable with practically no difficulty	Fair signals	Rough note, some trace of filtering
3	Readable with considerable difficulty	Weak signals	Rough a.c. tone, rectified but not filtered
2	Barely readable, occasional word distinguishable	Very weak signals	Very rough a.c., very harsh and broad
1	Unreadable	Faint—signals barely perceptible	Sixty cycle a.c or less, very rough and broad

=== SINPO code ===
SINPO is an acronym for Signal, Interference, Noise, Propagation, and Overall, which was developed by the CCIR in 1951 (as C.C.I.R. Recommendation No. 251) for use in radiotelegraphy, and the standard is contained in Recommendation ITU-R Sm.1135, SINPO and SINPFEMO codes. This format is most notably used by the BBC for receiving signal reports on postcards mailed from listeners, even though that same standard specifies that the SINPFEMO code should be used for radiotelephony transmissions. SINPO is the official radiotelegraph signal reporting codes for international civil aviation and ITU-R.

ITU-R SINPO Code
Rating scale	S	I	N	P	O
Rating scale		Degrading effect of			
Rating scale	Signal strength	Interference (man-made)	Noise (natural)	Propagation disturbance	Overall rating
5	Excellent	Nil	Nil	Nil	Excellent
4	Good	Slight	Slight	Slight	Good
3	Fair	Moderate	Moderate	Moderate	Fair
2	Poor	Severe	Severe	Severe	Poor
1	Barely audible	Extreme	Extreme	Extreme	Unusable

== Radiotelephony report formats ==
=== R-S-T system ===
Amateur radio operators use the R-S-T system to describe voice transmissions, dropping the last digit (Tone report) because there is no continuous wave tone to report on.

ARRL R-S-T System, as used for voice communications
No.	Meaning	
No.	R	S
9		Extremely strong signals
8		Strong signals
7		Moderately strong signals
6		Good signals
5	Perfectly readable	Fairly good signals
4	Readable with practically no difficulty	Fair signals
3	Readable with considerable difficulty	Weak signals
2	Barely readable, occasional word distinguishable	Very weak signals
1	Unreadable	Faint—signals barely perceptible

=== SINPEMFO code ===
An extension of SINPO code, for use in radiotelephony (voice over radio) communications, SINPFEMO is an acronym for Signal, Interference, Noise, Propagation, Frequency of Fading, Depth, Modulation, and Overall.

ITU-R SINPEMFO Code
Rating scale	S	I	N	P	F	E	M	O
Rating scale		Degrading effect of			Frequency of fading	Modulation		
Rating scale	Signal strength	Interference (man-made)	Noise (natural)	Propagation disturbance	Frequency of fading	Quality	Depth	Overall rating
5	Excellent	Nil	Nil	Nil	Nil	Excellent	Maximum	Excellent
4	Good	Slight	Slight	Slight	Slow	Good	Good	Good
3	Fair	Moderate	Moderate	Moderate	Moderate	Fair	Fair	Fair
2	Poor	Severe	Severe	Severe	Fast	Poor	Poor or Nil	Poor
1	Barely audible	Extreme	Extreme	Extreme	Very fast	Very Poor	Continuously over-modulated	Unusable

=== Plain-language radio checks ===
The move to plain-language radio communications means that number-based formats are now considered obsolete, and are replaced by plain language radio checks. These avoid the ambiguity of which number stands for which type of report and whether a 1 is considered good or bad. This format originated with the U.S. military in World War II, and is currently defined by ACP 125 (G)., published by the Combined Communications Electronics Board.

The prowords listed below are for use when initiating and answering queries concerning signal strength and readability.

ACP 125 (G) procedures for initiating and responding to a Radio Check
Proword	Meaning
RADIO CHECK	What is my signal strength and readability; how do you hear me?
ROGER	I have received your last transmission satisfactorily.
NOTHING HEARD	To be used when no reply is received from a called station.

ACP 125 (G) Plain-Language Radio Check Procedure Words
Proword	Meaning	Conjunction	Proword	Meaning
LOUD	Your signal is very strong.	AND or BUT, depending on which prowords are combined	CLEAR	The quality of your transmission is excellent.
GOOD	Your signal strength is good.	AND or BUT, depending on which prowords are combined	READABLE	The quality of your transmission is satisfactory.
WEAK	Your signal strength is weak.	AND or BUT, depending on which prowords are combined	UNREADABLE	The quality of your transmission is so bad that I cannot read you.
VERY WEAK	Your signal strength is very weak.	AND or BUT, depending on which prowords are combined	DISTORTED	Having trouble reading you due to interference.
FADING	At times your signal strength fades to such an extent that continuous reception cannot be relied upon.	AND or BUT, depending on which prowords are combined	WITH INTERFERENCE	Having trouble reading you due to interference.
		AND or BUT, depending on which prowords are combined	INTERMITTENT	Having trouble reading you because your signal is intermittent.

== Use in analog vs. digital radio transmission modes ==
In analog radio systems, as receiving stations move away from a radio transmitting site, the signal strength decreases gradually, causing the relative noise level to increase. The signal becomes increasingly difficult to understand until it can no longer be heard as anything other than static.

These reporting systems are usable for, but perhaps not completely appropriate for, rating digital signal quality. This is because digital signals have fairly consistent quality as the receiver moves away from the transmitter until reaching a threshold distance. At this threshold point, sometimes called the "digital cliff,"the signal quality takes a severe drop and is lost". This difference in reception reduces attempts to ascertain subjective signal quality to simply asking, "Can you hear me now?" or similar. The only possible response is "yes"; otherwise, there is just dead air. This sudden signal drop was also one of the primary arguments of analog proponents against moving to digital systems. However, the "five bars" displayed on many cell phones does directly correlate to the signal strength rating.

== Informal terminology and slang ==
The phrase "five by five" can be used informally to mean "good signal strength" or "loud and clear". An early example of this phrase was in 1946, recounting a wartime conversation. The phrase was used in 1954 in the novel The Blackboard Jungle. Another example usage of this phrase is from June 1965 by the crew of the Gemini IV spacecraft. This phrase apparently refers to the fact that the format consists of two digits, each ranging from one to five, with five/five being the best signal possible.

Some radio users have inappropriately started using the Circuit Merit telephone line quality measurement. This format is unsuitable for radiotelegraph or radio-telephony use because it focuses on voice-to-noise ratios, for judging whether a particular telephone line is suitable for commercial (paying customer) use, and does not include separate reports for signal strength and voice quality.

== See also ==
- Mean opinion score
- Perceptual Evaluation of Speech Quality (PESQ)
- Perceptual Objective Listening Quality Analysis (POLQA)
- Procedure word
