= Radio code =

Conventions used in wireless telegraphy

A radio code is any code that is commonly used over a telecommunication system such as Morse code, brevity codes and procedure words.

== Brevity code ==
Brevity codes are designed to convey complex information with a few words or codes. Specific brevity codes include:

- ACP-131
- Aeronautical Code signals
- ARRL Numbered Radiogram
- Multiservice tactical brevity code
- Ten-code
- Phillips Code
- NOTAM Code

=== Operating signals ===
Brevity codes that are specifically designed for use between communications operators and to support communication operations are referred to as "operating signals". These include:

- Prosigns for Morse code
- 92 Code, Western Union telegraph brevity codes
- Q code, initially developed for commercial radiotelegraph communication, later adopted by other radio services, especially amateur radio. Used since circa 1909.
- QN Signals, published by the ARRL and used by Amateur radio operators to assist in the transmission of ARRL Radiograms in the National Traffic System.
- R and S brevity codes, published by the British Post Office in 1908 for coastal wireless stations and ships, superseded in 1912 by Q codes
- X code, used by European military services as a wireless telegraphy code in the 1930s and 1940s
- Z code, also used in the early days of radiotelegraph communication.

== Other ==
Morse code is commonly used in amateur radio. Morse code abbreviations are a type of brevity code. Procedure words used in radiotelephony procedure, are a type of radio code. Spelling alphabets, including the ICAO spelling alphabet, are commonly used in communication over radios and telephones.

== Other meanings ==
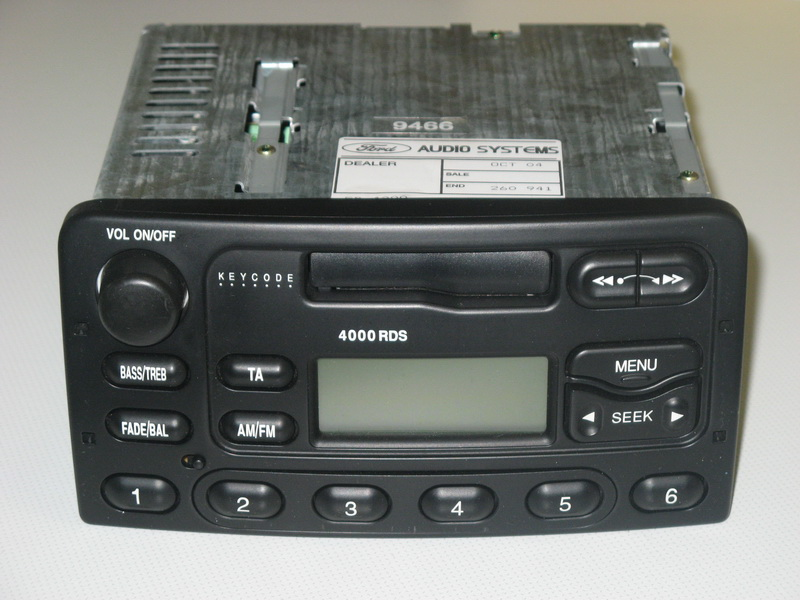
A Ford 4000 model audio unit that features a security code that needs to be entered after a power loss (the label on the front says "KEYCODE"). The unit also features a removable button facepanel as an additional anti-theft measure.

Many car audio systems (car radios) have a so-called 'radio code' number which needs to be entered after a power disconnection. This was introduced as a measure to deter theft of these devices. If the code is entered correctly, the radio is activated for use. Entering the code incorrectly several times in a row will cause a temporary or permanent lockout. Some car radios have another check which operates in conjunction with car electronics. If the VIN or another vehicle ID matches the previously stored one, the radio is activated. If the radio cannot verify the vehicle, it is considered to be moved into another vehicle. The radio will then request for the code number or simply refuse to operate and display an error message such as "CANCHECK" or "SECURE".

== See also ==
- Encoding
- One-time pad
