= QN Signals =

Morse code operating signal for Amateur radio messages

The QN Signals are Morse code operating signals that were introduced for Amateur radio net operation in 1939 on the Michigan QMN Net to lighten the burdens of net control operators. Originally created by a committee of the Detroit Amateur Radio Association led by Ralph Thetreat, W8FX. Ev Battey W1UE (W4IA-SK), then ARRL assistant communications manager, later printed them in QST.

The QN Signals are defined in ARRL document FSD-218 and listed in the ARRL Operating Manual.

Although these codes are within the Aeronautical Code signals range (QAA–QNZ) and thus conflict with official international Q signals beginning with QN, the ARRL informally queried the FCC's legal branch about the conflict. The opinion then of the FCC was that "no difficulty was forseen [sic?] as long as we continued to use them only in amateur nets."

== ARRL QN Signals For CW Net Use ==
QN Signal	Meaning/Question
QNA*	This is a request from the Net Control Station for all respondents to answer in a prearranged sequence, as a congestion avoidance measure.
QNB*	This is a request from the Net Control Station for one station to relay traffic between 2 other stations who cannot read each other.
QNC	An announcement alerting all stations on the Net to standby for an "All Stations" message, that is, a message of interest to all stations on the Net.
QND*	An announcement by the Net Control Station, that the Net is currently operating "Directed", that is, the Net Control Station is controlling all traffic. Often done during times of high Net usage. cf. QNF.
QNE*	A broadcast announcement to all stations by the Net Control Station, asking all stations on the Net to stop transmitting and stand by.
QNF	An announcement that the net is no longer "Directed", but is now free. cf. QND.
QNG	A request for a named station to assume the role of Net Control Station.
QNH	A notice to a named station that the frequency that the station is transmitting on is higher than the Net's nominal frequency. cf. QNL.
QNI	When used by the Net Control Station, this is a request for all stations to announce themselves. When used by a regular Net member, it simply is an announcement that they have joined.
QNJ	When used by itself, this asks the Net if the calling station can be heard. When used in conjunction with a station's call sign, it is asking if the Net can read that particular station.
QNK*	A request from the Net Control Station to send a message from a third party to a specific station.
QNL	A notice to a named station that the frequency that the station is transmitting on is lower than the Net's nominal frequency. cf. QNH.
QNM*	A notice from the Net Control Station to a particular station or stations, informing them that they are causing interference on the Net, and asking them to stop transmitting.
QNN	As a question, asks whom the Net Control Station is. As a declarative, it announces what station is the active Net Control Station.
QNO	An announcement by a particular station that they are signing off from the Net.
QNP	By itself, announces that the sending station was unable to understand the last station. When used with a station's call sign, announces that the sending station was unable to copy that named station.
QNQ*	A complex request from the Net Control Station asking a specific station to change frequency to a specified one, then to wait for a named station on that frequency to finish whatever traffic it is currently engaged in, and then to send that station traffic on behalf of yet a third named station. cf. QNV.
QNR	Requesting that any station please respond to a specific named station and receive traffic from them.
QNS*	As a question, asks for a listing of all stations currently on the net. As a declarative, announces what stations are on the Net, followed by the list thereof.
QNT	Request by a station to leave the net for a specified number of minutes.
QNU*	An announcement by the Net Control Station to a specific station, informing them that there is Net traffic for them, and to stand by to copy it.
QNV*	A complex request from the Net Control Station asking a specific station to make contact on the current frequency with a named station, and upon successful contact, to move to another specified frequency, and then to send that station traffic on behalf of yet a third named station. cf. QNQ.
QNW	A question from a station inquiring on how to route traffic for a specific named station.
QNX	As a question, a request from a station to leave the net. The Net Control Station will then reply with the same code, informing them that they may leave.
QNY*	A request by the Net Control Station for a station to change to another specified frequency and exchange all pending traffic with another named station.
QNZ	A request from one station to a second, asking that station to "Zero Beat" with the first station: a method of ensuring 2 stations are on the same frequency by transmitting simultaneously and fine-tuning the frequency until no acoustic beat is heard.

* QN-codes marked with an asterisk (*) are only for use by the Net Control Station.

== See also ==
- ACP-131
- ARRL
- Brevity code
- Morse code
- National Traffic System
- Prosigns for Morse code
- Q code
- Z code
