= Radiogram =

Radiogram may refer to:

- Radiogram (message), a telegram style message transmitted by radio
  - ARRL Radiogram, a particular format for such a message
- Radiogram (device), a piece of furniture combining a radio with an amplified gramophone
- Radiogram (album), a 2001 comedy album by The Bob and Tom Show
- Radiogram (medicine), a photographic image produced on a radiosensitive surface by radiation other than visible light (especially by X-rays or gamma rays)
