= Message precedence =

Indicator attached to telegraph message indicating its level of urgency

Message precedence is an indicator attached to a message indicating its level of urgency, and used in the exchange of radiograms in radiotelegraph and radiotelephony procedures. Email header fields can also provide a precedence flag.

== Early telegraphic procedures ==
In the early days of telegraphy and radiotelegraphy, individual countries, and sometimes individual states, sometimes set their own regulations. For example, in the period around 1909, California required that "messages must, if practicable, be transmitted immediately on and in order of receipt; if not practicable, then in the following order:"

1. Messages from public agents of the State or of the United States on public business.
2. Messages for immediate publication in newspapers, and not for any secret use.
3. Message relating to sickness or death.
4. Other messages in the order of filing.

== International regulation ==
Later in the development of telegraphy and radiotelegraphy, message precedence was nominally set by the International Telecommunication Union (ITU). Various ITU Regulations provide for the following priorities:

Service Indicator	Morse code precedence code	Meaning
Etat Priorité Nations	S	Telegram to or from the United Nations
Etat Priorité	S	Government telegram with priority
Etat	F	Government telegram without priority
OBS		Meteorological telegram
Urgent		Urgent private telegram
A Urgent		Urgent service telegram or advice
RCT		Telegram concerning persons protected in wartime by the Geneva Conventions of 12 August 1949
Presse		Press telegram
SVH		Telegram relating to the safety of life
A		Ordinary service telegram or advice
ADG		Service telegram or advice relating to an interruption of communications

The U.S. Code of Federal Regulations, Title 47, has included the following priorities:

- ETAT PRIORITE
- FLASH EMERGENCY
- IMMEDIATE EMERGENCY
- PRIORITY EMERGENCY
- URGENT

The current U.S. Title 47 specifies these precedence designators for radiograms:

Federal Government	Domestic public correspondence and international telephone calls
Flash	Flash emergency
Immediate	Immediate emergency
Priority	Priority emergency
Routine	(No domestic equivalent)

== CCEB military precedence ==
The Combined Communications Electronics Board (CCEB), a five-nation joint military communications-electronics organization (consisting of Australia, Canada, New Zealand, the United Kingdom, and the United States), uses the following message precedence designators, in descending order of importance:

- FLASH (Z) is reserved for initial enemy contact messages or operational combat messages of extreme urgency. Brevity is mandatory. FLASH messages are to be handled as fast as humanly possible, ahead of all other messages, with in-station handling time not to exceed 10 minutes. Messages of lower precedence are interrupted on all circuits involved until the handling of the FLASH message is completed.
- IMMEDIATE (O) is reserved for messages relating to situations gravely affecting the security of the nation. It requires immediate delivery. Examples include reports of widespread civil disturbance, reports or warning of grave natural disaster, and requests for or directions concerning search and rescue operations. IMMEDIATE messages are processed, transmitted, and delivered in the order received and ahead of all messages of lower precedence. They are to be handled as quickly as possible, with in-station handling time not to exceed 30 minutes. Messages of lower precedence should be interrupted on all circuits involved until the handling of the IMMEDIATE message is completed. The use of the letter "O" comes from the original name for this level, "operational immediate".
- PRIORITY (P) is reserved for all traffic requiring expeditious action by the addressee or for conducting operations in progress when ROUTINE precedence will not suffice. PRIORITY precedence messages are processed, transmitted, and delivered in the order received and ahead of all messages of ROUTINE precedence. Examples include requests for supplies or equipment during the conduct of an operation, time-critical items requiring quick response, and situation reports. They are to be handled as quickly as possible, with in-station handling time not to exceed 3 hours.
- ROUTINE (R) is used for all types of message traffic justifying transmission by rapid means, but not of sufficient urgency to require higher precedence. ROUTINE precedence messages are delivered in the order received and after all messages of higher precedence. Examples include any message that requires the documentation of its transmission or delivery; messages concerning normal operations, programs, or projects; and periodic or consolidated reports. They should be handled as soon as traffic flow allows, but no later than the beginning of the next duty day.
- Flash Override (Y): The National Command Authority (usually the President of the United States) has access to a FLASH OVERRIDE (FO) capability. FO is not a precedence, but instead represents the authority and means to override all other traffic, including FLASH precedence messages. In written message traffic, the proword 'Y' is used to indicate a message having the authority to override all other traffic and is usually assigned to Emergency Action Messages (EAM).

== Amateur radio message precedence ==
The American Amateur radio community uses EMERGENCY, PRIORITY, WELFARE and ROUTINE precedence levels for ARRL Radiograms sent through National Traffic System nets.

== See also ==
- IP precedence
- Multilevel precedence and preemption
