= Net operation =

Gathering of radio stations

A radio net is three or more radio stations communicating with each other on a common channel or frequency. A net is essentially a moderated conference call conducted over two-way radio, typically in half-duplex operating conditions and commonly through a radio repeater. The use of half-duplex operation requires a very particular set of operating procedures to be followed in order to avoid inefficiencies and chaos.

Nets operate either on schedule or continuously (continuous watch). Nets operating on schedule handle traffic only at definite, prearranged times and in accordance with a prearranged schedule of intercommunication. Nets operating continuously are prepared to handle traffic at any time; they maintain operators on duty at all stations in the net at all times. When practicable, messages relating to schedules will be transmitted by a means of signal communication other than radio.

Net operations:

- allow participants to conduct ordered conferences among participants who usually have common information needs or related functions to perform
- are characterized by adherence to standard formats and procedures, and
- are responsive to a common supervisory station, called the "net control station", which permits access to the net and maintains net operational discipline.

== Net manager ==
A net manager is the person who supervises the creation and operation of a net over multiple sessions. This person will specify the format, date, time, participants, and the net control script. The net manager will also choose the Net Control Station for each net, and may occasionally take on that function, especially in smaller organizations.

== Net Control Station ==
Radio nets are like conference calls in that both have a moderator who initiates the group communication, who ensures all participants follow the standard procedures, and who determines and directs when each other station may talk. The moderator in a radio net is called the Net Control Station, formally abbreviated NCS, and has the following duties:

- Establishes the net and closes the net;
- Directs Net activities, such as passing traffic, to maintain optimum efficiency;
- Chooses net frequency, maintains circuit discipline and frequency accuracy;
- Maintains a net log and records participation in the net and movement of messages; (always knows who is on and off net)
- Appoints one or more Alternate Net Control Stations (ANCS);
- Determines whether and when to conduct network continuity checks;
- Determines when full procedure and full call signs may enhance communications;
- Subject to Net Manager guidance, directs a net to be directed or free.

The Net Control Station will, for each net, appoint at least one Alternate Net Control Station, formally abbreviated ANCS (abbreviated NC2 in WWII procedures), who has the following duties:

- Assists the NCS to maintain optimum efficiency;
- Assumes NCS duties in event that the NCS develops station problems;
- Assumes NCS duties for a portion of the net, as directed or as needed;
- Serves as a resource for the NCS; echoes transmissions of the NCS if, and only if, directed to do so by the NCS;
- Maintains a duplicate net log

== Structure of the net ==
Nets can be described as always having a net opening and a net closing, with a roll call normally following the net opening, itself followed by regular net business, which may include announcements, official business, and message passing. Military nets will follow a very abbreviated and opaque version of the structure outlined below, but will still have the critical elements of opening, roll call, late check-ins, and closing.

A net should always operate on the same principle as the inverted pyramid used in journalism—the most important communications always come first, followed by content in ever lower levels of priority.

1. Net opening
  1. Identification of the NCS
  2. Announcement of the regular date, time, and frequency of the net
  3. Purpose of the net
2. Roll call
  1. A call for stations to check in, oftentimes from a roster of regular stations
  2. A call for late check-ins (stations on the roster who did not respond to the first check-in period)
  3. A call for guest stations to check in
3. Net business
4. Optional conversion to a free net
5. Net closing

Each net will typically have a main purpose, which varies according to the organization conducting the net, which occurs during the net business phase. For amateur radio nets, it's typically for the purpose of allowing stations to discuss their recent operating activities (stations worked, antennas built, etc.) or to swap equipment. For Military Auxiliary Radio System and National Traffic System nets, net business will involve mainly the passing of formal messages, known as radiograms.

== Two modes of net operation ==
- Directed Net
  - A net in which no station other than the net control station can communicate with any other station, except for the transmission of urgent messages, without first obtaining the permission of the net control station.
- Free net
  - A net in which any station may communicate with any other station in the same net without first obtaining permission from the net control station to do so.

== Net-control procedure words ==
U.S. Army Field Manual ACP 125(G) has the most complete set of procedure words used in radio nets:

Proword	Explanation	Prosign/ OPSIG
NET NOW	All stations are to net their radios on the unmodulated carrier wave which I am about to transmit.	ZRC2
THIS IS A DIRECTED NET	From now until further notice this net is directed.	ZKB
THIS IS A FREE NET	From now until further notice this net is free.	ZUG ZKB
BROADCAST YOUR NET	Link the two nets under your control for automatic rebroadcast	
STOP BROADCASTING	Cut the automatic link between the two nets that are being rebroadcast and revert to normal working.	
REBROADCAST YOUR NET	Commence automatic rebroadcasting of your other net onto this frequency	
STOP REBROADCASTING	Cease rebroadcasting your other net onto this frequency	QRT
ASSUME CONTROL	You will assume control of this net until further notice	ZKD
I AM ASSUMING CONTROL	I am assuming control of this net until further notice	ZKA
REPORTING INTO THE NET	Calling station is joining an established net or returning after having been closed down.	
REPORT STRENGTH AND READABILITY	Report to me how you are receiving all other stations on the net	
ANSWER AFTER	The station called is to answer after call sign........when answering transmissions.	ZGO
USE ABBREVIATED CALL SIGNS	Call signs are to be abbreviated until further notice.	
USE FULL CALL SIGNS	Call signs are to be sent in full until further notice.	
USE ABBREVIATED PROCEDURE	As conditions are normal, all stations are to use abbreviated procedure until further notice.	
USE FULL PROCEDURE	As conditions are not normal, all stations are to use full procedure until further notice.	
SILENCE (Repeated three or more times)	Cease transmissions on this net immediately. Silence will be maintained until lifted. (Transmissions must be authenticated by use of a self authenticated system, codeword, etc.)	H̅M̅ H̅M̅ H̅M̅
SILENCE LIFTED	Silence is lifted. (Transmissions must be authenticated by means of self authentication system, codeword, etc.)	ZUG H̅M̅ H̅M̅ H̅M̅
CLOSE DOWN	Stations are to close down when indicated. Acknowledgments are required	ZKJ

== Types of radio nets ==
Maritime mobile nets serve the needs of seagoing vessels.

=== Civil Air Patrol nets ===
The Civil Air Patrol defines a different set of nets:

Type	Usage
Command and Control (C2) Nets	For conveying messages and information between different locations and levels of command. This is where formal messages are exchanged, so it serves the same purpose as an IARU Traffic net.
Tactical Net	A Tactical Net is established whenever a requirement exists to coordinate the actions of deployed units in a mobile or portable environment. The primary purpose is to support deployed units, and it would generally be conducted from an Incident Command Post
Liaison Nets	Anytime CAP is involved with other agencies, CAP may be invited to participate on their frequencies or a previously signed agreement may allow the other agencies on CAP frequencies.
Contingency Nets	Communications managers at each level have the authority to initiate stand-by nets, placing CAP radio stations within their span of control on alert to be available for developing conditions that may result in mission activity.
Training Net	Communication managers may establish nets for training purposes, such as to teach radio procedures to novice operators, or new skills and procedures to more advanced operators.

=== Amateur radio nets ===
The International Amateur Radio Union defines six different types of nets in its IARU Emergency Telecommunications Guide:

Type	Usage
Traffic net	Handles formal written messages (radiograms)
Resource net	Used for incoming operators to receive assignments, and to be reassigned as needs changed. Can also be used to locate equipment and operators with special skills. More than one resource net may be created in large-scale events if the traffic warrants.
Logistics net	A type of resource net specifically tasked with logistical needs separate from those of the communications teams.
Tactical net	Handle the primary on-site emergency communication.
Information net	Used to disseminate official bulletins, answer general questions, etc.
Health and Welfare (H&W) net	Handle messages among those people impacted by or in the vicinity of a disaster and their friends and family living outside the disaster zone.

Other Amateur radio net types

Type	Usage
DX net	Used to exchange information on long-distance (DX) communications opportunities.
Hurricane Watch Net	Operating since Labor Day weekend, 1965, the Hurricane Watch Net is run by Amateur radio operators in support of the National Hurricane Center, using the callsign WX4NHC, on 14.325.00 MHz USB.
Skywarn net	Used to coordinate Amateur radio weather spotters, exchange weather reports, and coordinate ham radio responses to weather disasters—especially tornados.
Club net	A common practice among Amateur radio clubs, where a portion of the club membership meets on a defined frequency, on a defined schedule (often once a week) to conduct official club business, share recent radio operating activity and equipment builds or purchases, etc.
Hospital net	Conducts official communications for one or more county Departments of Public Health, to provide back-up and auxiliary communications during a time of crisis.
Awards Net	Amateur radio operators make contacts to work for awards on award type nets https://ustaw.net.

=== U.S. Military radio nets ===
The U.S. Army Field Manual FM 6-02.53, Tactical Radio Operations, defines the following types of radio nets:

Type	Usage
Command and Control (C2)	
Administrative and Logistics Nets	
Operations & Intelligence Nets	
Operations & Intelligence Nets	
Operations & Intelligence Nets	
Sustainment Operations Net	
High-Frequency and Data Nets	
Brigade Combat Team	
Medical Network	
Fire Direction Net	
Surveillance Net	
Sustainment Area Battle Command Net	

== Maritime radio nets ==
When boats or ships are in distress, they will operate a maritime broadcast communications net to communicate among the vessel in distress and all the other vessels, aircraft, and shore stations assisting in the distress response.

== See also ==
- Amateur radio net
