= Prosigns for Morse code =

Predefined shorthand signals

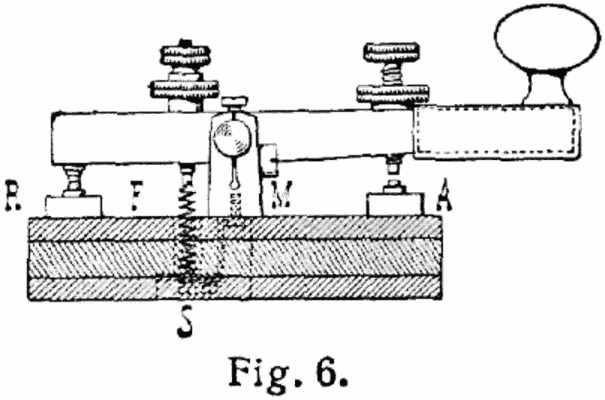
Diagram of a telegraph key used to send messages in Morse code

Procedural signs or prosigns are shorthand signals used in Morse code telegraphy, for the purpose of simplifying and standardizing procedural protocols for landline and radio communication. The procedural signs are distinct from conventional Morse code abbreviations, which consist mainly of brevity codes that convey messages to other parties with greater speed and accuracy. However, some codes are used both as prosigns and as single letters or punctuation marks, and for those there is an ambiguity even in context since they are not distinct.

== Overview ==
In the broader sense prosigns are just standardised parts of short form radio protocol, and can include any abbreviation. Examples would be K for "okay, heard you, continue" or R for "message, received". In a more restricted sense, "prosign" refers to something analogous to the nonprinting control characters in teleprinter and computer character sets, such as Baudot and ASCII. Different from abbreviations, those are universally recognizable across language barriers as distinct and well-defined symbols.

At the coding level, prosigns admit any form the Morse code can take, unlike abbreviations which have to be sent as a sequence of individual letters, like ordinary text. On the other hand, most prosigns codes are much longer than typical codes for letters and numbers. They are individual and indivisible code points within the broader Morse code, fully at par with basic letters and numbers.

The development of prosigns began in the 1860s for wired telegraphy. Since telegraphy preceded voice communications by several decades, many of the much older Morse prosigns have acquired precisely equivalent prowords for use in more recent voice protocols.

Not all prosigns used by telegraphers are standard: There are regional and community-specific variations of the coding convention used in certain radio networks to manage transmission and formatting of messages, and many unofficial prosign conventions exist; some of which might be redundant or ambiguous. One typical example of something which is not an officially recognized prosign, but is yet fairly often used in Europe, is one or two freely timed dits at the end of a message, I I or ▄ ▄ ▄ ▄ ; it is equivalent to the proword OUT, meaning "I'm done; go ahead". However the official prosign with the same meaning is A̅R̅, or ▄ ▄▄▄ ▄ ▄▄▄ ▄ , which takes a little longer to send.

=== Representation in printed material ===
Even though represented as strings of letters, prosigns are rendered without the intercharacter commas or pauses that would occur between the letters shown, if the representation were (mistakenly) sent as a sequence of letters: In printed material describing their meaning and use, prosigns are shown either as a sequence of dots and dashes for the sound of a telegraph, or by an overlined sequence of letters from the International Morse Code, which when sent without the usual spacing, sounds like the prosign symbol.

The best-known example of the convention is the standard distress call preamble: S̅O̅S̅. As a prosign it is not really composed of the three separate letters S, O, and S, (in International Morse: ▄ ▄ ▄ ▄▄▄ ▄▄▄ ▄▄▄ ▄ ▄ ▄ ) but is run together as a single symbol ▄ ▄ ▄ ▄▄▄ ▄▄▄ ▄▄▄ ▄ ▄ ▄ , which is a sign in its own right.

== History ==
In the early decades of telegraphy, many efficiency improvements were incorporated into operations. Each of the early versions of Morse code was an example of that: With only one glaring exception (Intl. Morse O), they all encoded more common characters into shorter keying sequences, and the rare ones into longer, thus effecting online data compression. The introduction of Morse symbols called procedural signs or prosigns was then just a logical progression. They were not defined by the developers of Morse code, but were gradually introduced by telegraph operators to improve the speed and accuracy of high-volume message handling, especially those sent over that era's problematic long distance communication channels, such as transoceanic cables and later longwave wireless telegraphy.

Among other prosign uses, improvement in the legibility of written messages sent by telegraph (telegrams) using white space formatting was supported by the procedural symbols. To become an efficient telegraph operator it was important to master the Morse code prosigns, as well as the many standard abbreviations used to facilitate checking and re-sending sections of text.

== Notation and representations ==
There are at least three methods used to represent Morse prosign symbols:

1. Unique dot/dash sequences, e.g. ▄▄▄ ▄ ▄ ▄ ▄▄▄
2. Unique audible sounds, e.g. dah di di di dah
3. Non-unique printed or written overlined character groups, (Note: When overlining is not available, the same characters can be written in <angle brackets> or underlined, hence B̅T̅ ( ▄▄▄ ▄ ▄ ▄ ▄▄▄ ) is equivalent to both <BT> and BT.) e.g. B̅T̅

Although some of the prosigns as-written appear to be simply two adjacent letters, most prosigns are transmitted as digraphs that have no pauses between the patterns that represent the "combined" letters, and are most commonly written with a single bar over the merged letters (if more than one single character) to indicate this. The only difference between what is transmitted for the Morse code prosign vs. the separate letter signs is the presence or absence of an inter-letter space between the two "dit" / "dah" sequences. Although the difference in the transmission is subtle, the difference in meaning is significant:

For example, the unofficial prosign A̅A̅ ( ▄ ▄▄▄ ▄ ▄▄▄ ) indicates that the receiving Morse operator should begin a new line, (Note: The prosign A̅A̅ is only used for multi-line addresses inside message headings of ARRL batched message format, where sending the more common B̅T̅ prosign would prematurely terminate the heading. The sequence produced by A̅A̅ = ▄ ▄▄▄ ▄ ▄▄▄ has also been in non-ITU (hence "unofficial") use in German language Morse for the letter Ä, for eastern European railway telegraphy.) but the two separate letter sign or abbreviation AA ( ▄ ▄▄▄ ▄ ▄▄▄ ) indicates the voice procedure words ALL AFTER, used to indicate what part of the previously transmitted message needs to be re-transmitted. (Note: Only when sent with ship-to-ship signal lights does the abbreviation AA have the same meaning as the voice procedure word UNKNOWN STATION.)

Because no letter boundaries are transmitted with the codes counted as prosigns, their representation by two letters is usually arbitrary, and may be done in multiple equivalent ways. Normally, one particular form is used by convention, but some prosigns have multiple forms in common use:

For example, A̅A̅ ( ▄ ▄▄▄ + ▄ ▄▄▄ ) is exactly equivalent to E̅K̅ ( ▄ + ▄▄▄ ▄ ▄▄▄ ) and R̅T̅ ( ▄ ▄▄▄ ▄ + ▄▄▄ ).

Although the well-known calling prosign for emergency messages S̅O̅S̅ is always represented by the three letters "SOS", it could just as well be written V̅Z̅E̅ ( ▄ ▄ ▄ ▄▄▄ + ▄▄▄ ▄▄▄ ▄ ▄ + ▄ ), V̅G̅I̅ ( ▄ ▄ ▄ ▄▄▄ + ▄▄▄ ▄▄▄ ▄ + ▄ ▄ ), or even 3̅B̅ ( ▄ ▄ ▄ ▄▄▄ ▄▄▄ + ▄▄▄ ▄ ▄ ▄ ); all of these render the same single code ▄ ▄ ▄ ▄▄▄ ▄▄▄ ▄▄▄ ▄ ▄ ▄ .

Many Morse code prosigns do not have written or printed textual character representations in the original source information, even if they do represent characters in other contexts. For example, when embedded in text the Morse code sequence ▄▄▄ ▄ ▄ ▄ ▄▄▄ represents the "double hyphen" character (normally "=", but also "– –"). When the same code appears alone it indicates the action of spacing down two lines on a page in order to create the white space indicating the start of a new paragraph or new section in a message heading. When used as a prosign, there is no actual written or printed character representation or symbol for a new paragraph (i.e. no symbol corresponding to "¶"), other than the two-line white space itself.

Some prosigns are in unofficial use for special characters in languages other than English, for example A̅A̅ is used unofficially for both the "next line" prosign and for "Ä", neither of which is in the international standard. Other prosigns are officially designated for both characters and prosigns, such as A̅R̅ equiv. "+", which marks the end of a message. (Note: A̅R̅ was used to mark the end of individual telegrams within a batched-message.) Some genuinely have only one use, such as C̅T̅ or the equivalent K̅A̅ ( ▄▄▄ ▄ ▄▄▄ ▄ ▄▄▄ ), the International Morse prosign that marks the start of a new transmission or new message.

== International Morse code ==
The procedure signs below are compiled from the official specification for Morse Code, ITU-R M.1677, International Morse Code, while others are defined the International Radio Regulations for Mobile Maritime Service, including ITU-R M.1170, ITU-R M.1172, and the Maritime International Code of Signals, with a few details of their use appearing in ACP 131, which otherwise defines operating signals, not procedure signals.

=== Prosigns ===
The following table of prosigns includes K and R, which could be considered either abbreviations (for "okay, go ahead", and for "received") or prosigns that are also letters. All of the rest of the symbols are not letters, but in some cases are also used as punctuation.

General-use procedure signs
Prosign	Matching voice procedure word	Code symbol	Reference	Explanation
A̅A̅	UNKNOWN STATION	▄ ▄▄▄ ▄ ▄▄▄		This meaning is only used for directional signal lights. It has no official use in radio telegraphy, where it is unofficially used to represent an accented letter Ä or Á, or the prosign for "next line", and then only when it is embedded inside a heading section in amateur traffic.
R	ROGER	▄ ▄▄▄ ▄		Means the last transmission has been received, but does not necessarily indicate the message was understood or will be complied with. ▄ ▄▄▄ ▄
K	OVER	▄▄▄ ▄ ▄▄▄		Invitation to transmit after terminating the call signal. (e.g. ▄ ▄▄▄ ▄ ▄▄▄ ▄ ▄▄▄ ▄ ▄▄▄ ). ▄▄▄ ▄ ▄▄▄
A̅R̅	OUT	▄ ▄▄▄ ▄ ▄▄▄ ▄		End of transmission / End of message / End of telegram. (Same as E̅C̅ "end copy", and character [ + ].) (Note: As of 2017 there was a proposal that (perhaps inadvertently) changes A̅R̅ protocol.) ▄ ▄▄▄ ▄ ▄▄▄ ▄
A̅S̅	WAIT	▄ ▄▄▄ ▄ ▄ ▄		"I must pause for a few minutes." (Note: A̅S̅ may optionally be followed by the estimated number of minutes of waiting time.) Also means "I am engaged in a contact with another station (that you might not hear); please wait quietly." ▄ ▄▄▄ ▄ ▄ ▄
A̅S̅ A̅R̅	WAIT OUT	▄ ▄▄▄ ▄ ▄ ▄ ▄ ▄▄▄ ▄ ▄▄▄ ▄		I must pause for more than a few minutes.
V̅E̅	VERIFIED	▄ ▄ ▄ ▄▄▄ ▄		Message is verified. ▄ ▄ ▄ ▄▄▄ ▄
[ ? ]	SAY AGAIN?	▄ ▄ ▄▄▄ ▄▄▄ ▄ ▄		When standing alone, a note of interrogation or request for repetition of the immediate prior transmission that was not understood. When [ ? ] is placed after a coded signal, modifies the code to be a question or request. ▄ ▄ ▄▄▄ ▄▄▄ ▄ ▄
I̅N̅T̅	INTERROGATIVE	▄ ▄ ▄▄▄ ▄ ▄▄▄		Military replacement for the [ ? ] prosign; equivalent to Spanish [ ¿ ] punctuation mark. When placed before a signal, modifies the signal to be a question/request. (Note: 1945 procedural use: "The correctness of a short portion of a message may be questioned directly by the receiving operator using the interrogatory prosign I̅N̅T̅, but this method should not be used to question a part of a message for which a receipt has been given.)
H̅H̅ ...	CORRECTION	▄ ▄ ▄ ▄ ▄ ▄ ▄ ▄		Preceding text was in error. The following is the corrected text. (Same as I̅I̅I̅I̅ or E̅E̅E̅E̅E̅E̅E̅E̅.) ▄ ▄ ▄ ▄ ▄ ▄ ▄ ▄
H̅H̅ A̅R̅	DISREGARD THIS TRANSMISSION OUT	▄ ▄ ▄ ▄ ▄ ▄ ▄ ▄ ▄ ▄▄▄ ▄ ▄▄▄ ▄		The entire message just sent is in error, disregard it. (Same as E̅E̅E̅E̅E̅E̅E̅E̅ A̅R̅.) (Note: The prowords H̅H̅ A̅R̅ may not be used to cancel a message after it has already been completely transmitted, and receipt acknowledged.)
B̅T̅	BREAK	▄▄▄ ▄ ▄ ▄ ▄▄▄		Start new section of message. Same as character [ = ] or rarely [ – – ] .
K̅A̅	ATTENTION	▄▄▄ ▄ ▄▄▄ ▄ ▄▄▄		Message begins / Start of work / New message (Starting signal that precedes every transmission session. Sometimes written as C̅T̅.) ▄▄▄ ▄ ▄▄▄ ▄ ▄▄▄
S̅K̅	OUT	▄ ▄ ▄ ▄▄▄ ▄ ▄▄▄		End of contact / End of work / Line is now free / Frequency no longer in use (Ending signal that follows every transmission session. Occasionally written V̅A̅.); Also used as shorthand to describe a "Silent Key", i.e. a radio operator who has passed away.

=== Abbreviations for message handling ===
The following table lists standard abbreviations used for organizing radiotelegraph traffic, however none of them are actual prosigns, despite their similar purpose. All are strictly used as normal strings of one to several letters, never as digraph symbols, and have standard meanings used for the management of sending and receiving messages. Dots following indicate that in use, the abbreviation is always followed by more information.

General-use abbreviations and letter-codes
Abbrev.	Matching voice procedure word	Code symbol	Reference	Explanation
DE ...	[THIS IS] FROM	▄▄▄ ▄ ▄ ▄		Used to precede the name or other identification of the station sending the transmission (Morse abbreviation).
NIL	NOTHING HEARD	▄▄▄ ▄ ▄ ▄ ▄ ▄▄▄ ▄ ▄		General-purpose response to any request or inquiry for which the answer is "nothing" or "none" or "not available" (Morse abbr.). Also means "I have no messages for you."
CL	CLOSING	▄▄▄ ▄ ▄▄▄ ▄ ▄ ▄▄▄ ▄ ▄		Announcing station shutdown (Morse abbr.).
CQ	CALLING	▄▄▄ ▄ ▄▄▄ ▄ ▄▄▄ ▄▄▄ ▄ ▄▄▄		General call to any station (Morse abbr.).
CP ... ...	CALLING FOR	▄▄▄ ▄ ▄▄▄ ▄ ▄ ▄▄▄ ▄▄▄ ▄		Specific call to two or more named stations (Morse abbr.).
CS ...	CALLING STATION	▄▄▄ ▄ ▄▄▄ ▄ ▄ ▄ ▄		Specific call to exactly one named station (Morse abbr.).
CS ?	WHO ?	▄▄▄ ▄ ▄▄▄ ▄ ▄ ▄ ▄ ▄ ▄ ▄▄▄ ▄▄▄ ▄ ▄		What is the name or identity signal of your station? (Morse abbr.) In many contexts, the question mark is optional.
WA ...	WORD AFTER	▄ ▄▄▄ ▄▄▄ ▄ ▄▄▄		(Morse abbr.)
WB ...	WORD BEFORE	▄ ▄▄▄ ▄▄▄ ▄▄▄ ▄ ▄ ▄		(Morse abbr.)
AA ...	ALL AFTER	▄ ▄▄▄ ▄ ▄▄▄		The portion of the message to which I refer is all that follows the text ... (Morse abbr.)
AB ...	ALL BEFORE	▄ ▄▄▄ ▄▄▄ ▄ ▄ ▄		The portion of the message to which I refer is all that precedes the text ... (Morse abbr.)
BN ... ...	ALL BETWEEN	▄▄▄ ▄ ▄ ▄ ▄▄▄ ▄		The portion of the message to which I refer is all that falls between ... and ... (Morse abbr.)
C	CORRECT / YES / AFFIRMATIVE / CONFIRM	▄▄▄ ▄ ▄▄▄ ▄		Answer to prior question is "yes". (Morse abbr.)
N	NO / NEGATIVE	▄▄▄ ▄		Answer to prior question is "no". (Morse abbr.) (Note: When Morse was still being used in aeronautics, the entire word NO ( ▄▄▄ ▄ ▄▄▄ ▄▄▄ ▄▄▄ ) was sent instead of the abbreviation N.)
ZWF ...	WRONG	▄▄▄ ▄▄▄ ▄ ▄ ▄ ▄▄▄ ▄▄▄ ▄ ▄ ▄▄▄ ▄		Your last transmission was wrong. The correct version is ...
QTR ?	REQUEST TIME CHECK	▄▄▄ ▄▄▄ ▄ ▄▄▄ ▄▄▄ ▄ ▄▄▄ ▄ ▄ ▄ ▄▄▄ ▄▄▄ ▄ ▄		Time-check request. / What is the correct time? (Time is always UTC, unless explicitly requested otherwise, e.g. QTR HST ?)
QTR ...	TIME IS	▄▄▄ ▄▄▄ ▄ ▄▄▄ ▄▄▄ ▄ ▄▄▄ ▄		The following is the correct time in HHMM 24 hour format (The time is always in UTC, except in rare cases when it is followed by a 3 letter time zone abrv., e.g. PST.)
BK	BREAK-IN	▄▄▄ ▄ ▄ ▄ ▄▄▄ ▄ ▄▄▄		Signal used to interrupt a transmission already in progress (Morse abbr.). NATO nets use AX. Some military networks use ▄▄▄▄▄▄▄▄▄▄▄ ≈ T̅T̅T̅T̅ instead.
CFM	CONFIRM / I ACKNOWLEDGE	▄▄▄ ▄ ▄▄▄ ▄ ▄ ▄ ▄▄▄ ▄ ▄▄▄ ▄▄▄		Message received (Morse abbr.). (Same as R.)
WX ...	WEATHER IS	▄ ▄▄▄ ▄▄▄ ▄▄▄ ▄ ▄ ▄▄▄		Weather report follows (Morse abbr.).
INTERCO	INTERCO (in-tur-ko)	▄ ▄ ▄▄▄ ▄ ▄▄▄ ▄ ▄ ▄▄▄ ▄ ▄▄▄ ▄ ▄▄▄ ▄ ▄▄▄ ▄▄▄ ▄▄▄		Groups of abbreviations from the International Code of Signals follow (Morse abbr.).

== Amateur radio National Traffic System ==
For the special purpose of exchanging ARRL Radiograms during National Traffic System nets, the following prosigns and signals can be used, most of which are an exact match with ITU-R and Combined Communications Electronics Board (military) standards; a few have no equivalent in any other definition of Morse code procedure signals or abbreviations.

Table of Morse code prosigns and useful Morse code abbreviations
Prosign	Code symbol	Meaning	Comments	Verbalization	As text
A̅A̅	▄ ▄▄▄ ▄ ▄▄▄	Start new line	Space down one line; typewritten as Carriage Return, Line Feed (CR-LF). Only used instead of B̅T̅ in ARRL batched messages, where B̅T̅ would prematurely start a pending next section. Also written R̅T̅.	di dah di dah	Ä, Á (Note: Non-ITU Code adopted nationally for languages with letters not used in Latin, English, or Italian.)
A̅R̅	▄ ▄▄▄ ▄ ▄▄▄ ▄	Message separator, start new message / telegram.	New Page, space down several lines. Decoder software may show [ + ]. Alternative for "Break" in conversational Morse. Also written R̅N̅.	di dah di dah dit	[ + ]
A̅S̅	▄ ▄▄▄ ▄ ▄ ▄	Wait	Respond with: S̅N̅, or characters "R" (Received) or "C" (Confirmed).	di dah di di dit	[ & ] (Note: Proposed double-use as punctuation ampersand; non-standard. Abbreviation "E S" is typically used instead.)
B̅T̅	▄▄▄ ▄ ▄ ▄ ▄▄▄	Start new section / paragraph	Space down two lines; typewritten CR-LF-LF. Decoder software may show [ = ].	dah di di di dah	[ = ], [ – – ]
C̅T̅	▄▄▄ ▄ ▄▄▄ ▄ ▄▄▄	Start of transmission Start of new message	Attention commencing transmission. Also written K̅A̅.	dah di dah di dah	
H̅H̅ ...	▄ ▄ ▄ ▄ ▄ ▄ ▄ ▄	Error / correction	Always followed by correct text. Equivalent to both I̅I̅I̅I̅ and E̅E̅E̅E̅E̅E̅E̅E̅ . Sometimes transcribed as "???".	di di di di di di di dit	
K	▄▄▄ ▄ ▄▄▄	Invitation for any station to transmit	Lone alphabetic character "K" at the end of a transmission.	dah di dah	K
X	▄▄▄ ▄ ▄ ▄▄▄	Full stop	Lone alphabetic character "X" surrounded by word spaces. Substitute for period A̅A̅A̅ in ARRL batched messages.	dah di di dah	X
[ ? ]	▄ ▄ ▄▄▄ ▄▄▄ ▄ ▄	Please say again	Lone question mark "?" from the receiving station in response to a transmission; possibly followed by AA ... or AB ... .	di di dah dah di dit	[ ? ]
K̅N̅	▄▄▄ ▄ ▄▄▄ ▄▄▄ ▄	Invitation for named station to transmit	Go ahead, specific named station. Decoder software may show equivalent character [ ( ].	dah di dah dah dit	[ ( ]
N̅J̅	▄▄▄ ▄ ▄ ▄▄▄ ▄▄▄ ▄▄▄	Shift to Wabun code	Shift from Morse code to Wabun code Kana characters. Also written X̅M̅.	dah di di dah dah dah	
S̅K̅	▄ ▄ ▄ ▄▄▄ ▄ ▄▄▄	End of work / End of contact / Frequency no longer in use	Also written V̅A̅.	di di di dah di dah	
S̅N̅	▄ ▄ ▄ ▄▄▄ ▄	Understood / verify / verified	Message received and checks okay. Alternatively shift from Wabun to Morse code. "S̅N̅?" verification requested. Also written V̅E̅.	di di di dah dit	Š, Ś
S̅O̅S̅	▄ ▄ ▄ ▄▄▄ ▄▄▄ ▄▄▄ ▄ ▄ ▄	Start of a distress signal	Only used by the original distressed station, and only for imminent danger to life or property.	di di di dah dah dah di di dit	
D̅D̅D̅	▄▄▄ ▄ ▄ ▄▄▄ ▄ ▄ ▄▄▄ ▄ ▄	Start of a distress signal relayed from another station	Used to forward a copy of a received "S̅O̅S̅".	dah di di dah di di dah di dit	
BK	▄▄▄ ▄ ▄ ▄ ▄▄▄ ▄ ▄▄▄	Break in conversation	Morse abbreviation for "back-to you" (Morse abbr.). In conversational Morse some use any of A̅R̅, B̅T̅, K̅N̅, or "K" instead.	dah di di dit dah di dah	BK
CL	▄▄▄ ▄ ▄▄▄ ▄ ▄ ▄▄▄ ▄ ▄	Closing down	Abbreviation for "closing station" (Morse abbr.).	dah di dah dit di dah di dit	CL

== Obsolete prosigns ==
Historical Morse code prosigns
Prosign	Matching voice procedure word	Former code symbol	Explanation	Reference
CQD	Distress call	▄▄▄ ▄ ▄▄▄ ▄ ▄▄▄ ▄▄▄ ▄ ▄▄▄ ▄▄▄ ▄ ▄	Obsolete code used to call all stations during distress (see CQ). Replaced by S̅O̅S̅ in 1906 (see above).	
V̅E̅	General call	▄ ▄ ▄ ▄▄▄ ▄	Code re-used for "Message verified" or "Message understood" (see S̅N̅ above). Replaced by CQ (see above).	1937 Royal Navy Signal Card
N̅N̅N̅N̅N̅	Answering sign	▄▄▄ ▄ ▄▄▄ ▄ ▄▄▄ ▄ ▄▄▄ ▄ ▄▄▄ ▄	Dropped.	1937 Royal Navy Signal Card
i i	Separative sign break	▄ ▄ ▄ ▄	Generally replaced by B̅T̅, although it is still used in MARS CW operations, and other military standards. Later re-used for both a "ditto" mark and to represent the warning "I repeat" before a duplicated transmission.	1937 Royal Navy Signal Card
E̅E̅E̅E̅E̅	Error	▄ ▄ ▄ ▄ ▄	Exactly five dits (code for digit 5). Replaced by H̅H̅ (exactly eight dits, E̅E̅E̅E̅E̅E̅E̅E̅).	1937 Royal Navy Signal Card
R̅R̅R̅R̅R̅	Receipt sign	▄▄▄▄▄▄▄▄▄▄▄▄▄▄▄▄▄▄▄▄▄▄▄▄▄▄▄▄▄▄▄▄▄▄▄▄▄▄▄▄▄▄	Replaced by R.	1937 Royal Navy Signal Card
É (printed as e̅)	Further message sign	▄ ▄ ▄▄▄ ▄ ▄	Re-purposed original ITU symbol for É not used in English.	1937 Royal Navy Signal Card

== See also ==
- Morse code abbreviations
- Brevity code
- Procedure word (proword)
- Q code
- QSA and QRK code
- Z code
