= Q and Z signals =

Q and Z signals are brevity codes widely used in Morse code radio telegraphy. See, respectively:

- Q code
- Z code
