= Morse code abbreviations =

Abbreviations commonly used in Morse code

Morse code abbreviations are used to speed up Morse communications by foreshortening textual words and phrases. Morse abbreviations are short forms, representing normal textual words and phrases formed from some (fewer) characters taken from the word or phrase being abbreviated. Many are typical English abbreviations, or short acronyms for often-used phrases.

== Distinct from prosigns and commercial codes ==
Morse code abbreviations are not the same as prosigns. Morse abbreviations are composed of (normal) textual alpha-numeric character symbols with normal Morse code inter-character spacing; the character symbols in abbreviations, unlike the delineated character groups representing Morse code prosigns, are not "run together" or concatenated in the way most prosigns are formed.

Although a few abbreviations (such as SX for "dollar") are carried over from former commercial telegraph codes, almost all Morse abbreviations are not commercial codes. From 1845 until well into the second half of the 20th century, commercial telegraphic code books were used to shorten telegrams, e.g. PASCOELA = "Locals have plundered everything from the wreck." However, these cyphers are typically "fake" words six characters long, or more, used for replacing commonly used whole phrases, and are distinct from single-word abbreviations.

== Word and phrase abbreviations ==
The following Table of Morse code abbreviations and further references to Brevity codes such as 92 Code, Q code, Z code, and R-S-T system serve to facilitate fast and efficient Morse code communications.

Table of selected Morse code abbreviations
Abbreviation	Meaning	Defined in	Type of abbreviation
AA ...	All after (used after question mark to request a repetition)	ITU-R M.1172	operating signal
AB ...	All before (similarly)	ITU-R M.1172	operating signal
ADRS	Address	ITU-T Rec. F.1	operating signal
ADS	Address	ITU-R M.1172	operating signal
AGN	Again		operating signal
ANT	Antenna		
A̅R̅	End of transmission.	ITU-R M.1172	operating signal
A̅S̅	Wait		operating signal
BK	Break (to pause transmission of a message, say)	ITU-R M.1172	operating signal
BN ... ...	All between	ITU-R M.1172	operating signal
C	Yes; correct; affirmative		operating signal
CFM	Confirm	ITU-R M.1172	operating signal
CK	Check		
CL	Closing (I am closing my station)	ITU-R M.1172	operating signal
CP ... ...	Calling several stations (followed by the call signs of two or more stations, e.g. CP T4SRJ C5ADK for "calling stations T4SRJ and C5ADK")		operating signal
CQ	Calling (calling all stations / any station) (do not follow with PLS or PSE; see LID)	ITU-R M.1172	operating signal
CQD	All stations distress (used prior to replacement by SOS to let all operators know of an impending distress signal)		operating signal
CS ...	Calling station (followed by the call sign of a particular station, e.g. CS F3TL for "calling station F3TL")	ITU-R M.1172	operating signal
CS?	What call sign? (used with "?" to request a contact's call sign)	ITU-R M.1172	operating signal
DE ...	From (or "this is")	ITU-R M.1172	operating signal
DX	Long distance, foreign countries (sometimes refers to long distance contact)		
ES	And / [ & ] / also / et	American Morse code	
FB	Good (literal abbr. "fine business")	Amateur radio slang; suspected euphemism	
FM ...	From (see DE)		operating signal
FWD	Forward		
I I	I say again; I repeat; ditto; alt. European: "<station> out".		
K	Invitation to transmit	ITU-R M.1172, ITU-R M.1677-1	operating signal
K̅N̅	Over to you; only the previously named station should respond (e.g. after K6PCH DE W1AW K̅N̅ ; only station K6PCH should reply to W1AW)	ITU-R M.1677-1	operating signal
LID	Poor operator (derogatory)	Wire telegraph slang, same as PLUG	
MSG	Prefix indicating a message to or from the master of a ship concerning its operation or navigation	ITU-R M.1172	
N	No; nine		
NIL	I have nothing to send you	ITU-R M.1172	
NR ... ...	Number follows		operating signal
OK	Okay	ITU-R M.1172, ITU-T Rec. F.1	operating signal
OM	Old Man (any male radio operator or male spouse of radio operator, both regardless of age)	Amateur radio slang	
PLS	Please (not appropriate after CQ; see LID)	ITU-T Rec. F.1	
PPR	Paper	ITU-T Rec. F.1	
PSE	Please	ITU-R M.1172	
PX	Prefix		
R	Received as transmitted (origin of "Roger")	ITU-T Rec. F.1	operating signal
RX	Receiver / Receive		
RPT	Report / Repeat please / I repeat as follows	ITU-R M.1172, ITU-T Rec. F.1	
RSN	Readability (1-5) / Strength (1-9) / Noise (1-9)	Not yet in widespread use	
RST ... ... ...	Signal report format (Readability / Signal Strength / Tone)	In universal amateur radio use	operating signal
SFR	So far (proword)		
SIG	Signature	ITU-T Rec. F.1	
S̅K̅	Out (prosign), end of contact		operating signal
SK	Silent Key (a deceased radio amateur)	Amateur radio slang; from S̅K̅, the last signal received from a radio contact	
SVP	Please (French: "S'il vous plaît")	ITU-T Rec. F.1	
SX	Dollars	Phillips Code	
THX	Thanks, Thank You		
TU	Thank You		
TX	Transmitter / Transmit		
W	Word / Words	ITU-T Rec. F.1	
WA ...	Word after	ITU-R M.1172	operating signal
WB ...	Word before	ITU-R M.1172	operating signal
WC	Wilco; "Will comply"		operating signal
WD	Word / Words	ITU-R M.1172	
WX ... ... ...	Weather / Weather report follows	ITU-R M.1172	
XCVR	Transceiver		
XYL	Former Young Lady (female spouse of radio operator, regardless of age)	Amateur radio slang	
YL	Young Lady (any female radio operator, regardless of age)	Amateur radio slang	
Z ... ... ... ...	Zulu time i.e. UTC		operating signal
161	Best regards + Love and kisses; used on YL networks as a sign-off		sum of two 92 Codes
30	No more; this is the end; finished	Not used in radiotelegraphy	92 Code
72	Best regards	Amateur radio slang. While operating QRP / low power	92 Code
73	Best regards		92 Code
75	Derogatory term for a disliked operator (Referring to 75 meter ham band)	Amateur radio slang, USA only	
77	Long Live CW (Morse Code), wishing you many happy CW contacts		
88	Love and kisses		92 Code
99	Get lost!		

== An amateur radio Morse code conversation example ==
To make Morse code communications faster and more efficient, there are many internationally agreed patterns or conventions of communication which include: extensive use of abbreviations, use of brevity codes such as 92 Code, RST code, Q code, Z code as well as the use of Morse prosigns. The skills required to have efficient fast conversations with Morse comprise more than simply knowing the Morse code symbols for the alphabet and numerals. Skilled telegraphists must also know many traditional International Morse code communications conventions.

In the following example of a typical casual Morse code conversation between two stations there is extensive use of such: Morse code abbreviations, brevity codes, Morse procedural signs, and other such conventions.

An example casual Morse code (CW) conversation between Station S1ABC and Station S2YZ is illustrated in the following paragraphs. Here the actual Morse code information stream sent by each station (S1ABC and S2YZ) is shown in bold face small capitals type, and is followed below each bold face transmission by an indented interpretation of the message sent, together with short explanations of the codes. These translations and explanations are shown below each station's indicated transmission data stream.

S1ABC transmits an open call in Morse:
CQ CQ CQ DE S1ABC R̅N̅ K

Calling anyone (CQ CQ CQ) from (DE) station S1ABC.
End message (R̅N̅). Go ahead anyone (K).

S2YZ responds to the call by transmitting the short Morse reply:
S1ABC DE S2YZ K̅N̅

To station S1ABC from station S2YZ. Over to you only.

(K̅N̅ = " ▄▄▄ ▄ ▄▄▄ ▄▄▄ ▄ " is the unofficial prosign for only inviting a reply from the station named in the message; it is the same as the code for open parentheses [(] punctuation symbol.)

S1ABC transmits Morse message:
S2YZ DE S1ABC = GA DR OM UR RST 5NN HR = QTH ALMERIA = OP IS JOHN = HW? S2YZ DE S1ABC K̅N̅

To station S2YZ from station S1ABC.

(Note that the equal signs ([=] = B̅T̅ = ▄▄▄ ▄ ▄ ▄ ▄▄▄ ) in the code should be interpreted here as the new section prosign which is also the symbol for a double hyphen [=]. See discussion in subsection below.)

Good afternoon 'dear old man' (friendly address to other operator)
Your RST rating is 599 here (at my station)

(Note: RST is the Readability, Strength, and Tone report code; the Ns are abbreviations for the number 9. RST 5NN reports the signal is very readable (5) and very strong (N), with very good tone (N).

I'm located (QTH) in Almería.
The station operator's (OP) name is John.
How do you copy my signal? (HW?)
To station S2YZ from station S1ABC:
Over to you only.

S2YZ transmits Morse message:
S1ABC DE S2YZ = TNX FB RPRT DR OM JOHN UR 559 = QTH BARCELONA = NM IS ANDY S1ABC DE S2YZ K̅N̅

To station S1ABC from station S2YZ.
Thanks for the good report

(FB or Fine Business means "good")

'dear old man' John. You are [RST] 559.

(very readable (5), average strength (5), very good tone (9).)

I am in (QTH) Barcelona.
My name (NM) is Andy.
To station S1ABC from station S2YZ:
Over to you only.

S1ABC transmits Morse message:
S2 DE S1ABC = OK TNX QSO DR ANDY = 73 ES HPE CUAGN S2YZ DE S1ABC K̅N̅

To station S2YZ from station S1ABC.
Okay, thanks for this conversation (QSO), 'dear' Andy.
Best regards (73) and (ES) hope (HPE) to see you again (CUAGN).
To station S2YZ from station S1ABC:
Over to you only.

S2YZ sends Morse message:
S1ABC DE S2YZ = R TU CUAGN 73 S1ABC DE S2YZ R̅N̅ S̅K̅

To station S1ABC from station S2YZ.
Roger (R)
Thank you (TU) see you again (CUAGN)
Best regards (73)
To station S1ABC from station S2YZ:
Signing off.

(R̅N̅ = " ▄ ▄▄▄ ▄ ▄▄▄ ▄ ", is the end of message prosign; it means "this message finished")
(S̅K̅ = " ▄ ▄ ▄ ▄▄▄ ▄ ▄▄▄ ", is the end of work prosign; it means "no more messages" / "frequency is now clear")

== Aside on shared codes ==
In International Morse code there is no distinct dot-dash sequence defined only for the mathematical equal sign [=]; rather the same code ( ▄▄▄ ▄ ▄ ▄ ▄▄▄ or dah di di di dah) is shared by double hyphen [=] and the procedural sign for section separator notated as B̅T̅ . It is fairly common in the Recommended International Morse Code for punctuation codes to be shared with prosigns. For example, the code for plus or cross ([+] = ▄ ▄▄▄ ▄ ▄▄▄ ▄ ) is the same as the prosign for end of telegram, and the widely used but non-ITU "Over to you only" prosign K̅N̅ is the official code for open parentheses [(] or left bracket.

The listener is required to distinguish the meaning by context. In the example casual conversation between two station operators, above, the Morse transmissions show the equal sign [=] in the same way that a simple electronic automatic Morse code reader with a one- or two-line display does: It can't distinguish context so it always displays the math symbol. It would also display an open parenthesis [(] for the over to you only prosign (K̅N̅ = ▄▄▄ ▄ ▄▄▄ ▄▄▄ ▄ ).

The use of the end of section prosign B̅T̅ in casual exchanges essentially indicates a new paragraph in the text or a new sentence, and is a little quicker to send than a full stop ([.] = ▄ ▄▄▄ ▄ ▄▄▄ ▄ ▄▄▄ ) required in telegrams.

Normally an operator copying Morse code by hand or typewriter would decide whether the equal sign [=] or the "new section" prosign B̅T̅ was meant and start new paragraph in the recorded text upon reception of the code. This new paragraph copying convention is illustrated in the example conversation in the prior section.

When decoding in one's head, instead of writing text on paper or into a computer file, the receiving operator copying mentally will interpret the B̅T̅ prosign for either a mental pause, or to jot down for later reference a short word or phrase from the information being sent.

== Informal language-independent conversations ==
Rag chewer is a name applied to amateur radio Morse code operators who engage in informal Morse code conversations (known as chewing the rag) while discussing subjects such as: The weather, their location, signal quality, and their equipment (especially the antennas being used).

Meaningful rag chewing between fluent Morse code operators having different native languages is possible because of a common language provided by the prosigns for Morse code, the International Q code, Z code, RST code, the telegraph era Phillips Code and 92 codes, and many well known Morse code abbreviations including those discussed in this article. Together all of these traditional conventions serve as a somewhat cryptic but commonly understood language (Lingua Franca) within the worldwide community of amateur radio Morse code operators.

These codes and protocols efficiently encode many well known statements and questions from many languages into short simple character groups which may be tapped out very quickly. The international Q code for instance encodes literally hundreds of full normal language sentences and questions in short three character codes each beginning with the character Q. For example, the code word QTH ... means My transmitting location is ... , which radio operators typically take instead to mean My home is ... . If this code word is followed by a question mark as QTH? it means What is your transmitting location?

Typically very few full words will be spelled out in Morse code conversations. Similar to phone texting, vowels are often left out to shorten transmissions and turn overs. Other examples, of internationally recognized uses of Morse code abbreviations and well known code numbers, such as those of the Phillips Code from past eras of telegraph technology, are abbreviations such as WX for weather and SX for dollar, and from wire signal codes, the numbers 73 for best regards and 88 for love and kisses.

These techniques are similar to, and often faster than, texting on modern cellphones. Using this extensive lingua franca that is widely understood across many languages and cultures, surprisingly meaningful Morse code conversations can be efficiently conducted with short transmissions independently of native languages, even between operators who cannot actually communicate by voice because of language barriers.

With heavy use of the Q code and Morse code abbreviations, surprisingly meaningful conversations can readily occur. Note that in the preceding example conversation very few full English words have been used. In fact, in the above example S1 and S2 might not speak the same native language. Although lengthy or detailed conversations could not, of course, be accomplished by radio operators with no common language.

Contesters often use a very specialized and even shorter format for their contacts. Their purpose is to process as many contacts as possible in a limited time (e.g. 100–150 contacts per hour).

== See also ==
- 92 Code
- ACP 131
- Brevity code
- [International] Morse code
- Prosigns for Morse code
- Phillips Code
- Q code
- R-S-T System
- Z code
