= Q and Z codes =

Q and Z codes, also called Q and Z signals may refer to:

- Q code, 3-letter code beginning with Q and used by radiotelegraph and other radio services
- Z code, 3-letter code used in radio communications
