= QNI =

QNI may refer to:

- Quality of Nationality Index
- Queensland-New South Wales Interconnector
- Queensland Nickel
- Queen's Nursing Institute
- Quincy Newspapers
- a QN signal used in amateur radio
