= QND =

QND may refer to:

- Quantum nondemolition measurement
- QND, one of the QN Signals for amateur radio
- Qnd, a mineral symbol for Qandilite
