= ARRL Numbered Radiogram =

Brevity code for sending standard Ham radio messages

An ARRL Numbered Radiogram is a brevity code used in composing ARRL/RRI radiogram or radiogram-ICS213 messages during times of radio congestion.

The codes are used to transmit standard messages, sometimes with customized text, very quickly by experienced ARRL or RRI National Traffic System (NTS) message traffic handlers.

In use, ARRL/RRI Numbered Radiogram Codes are messages encoded as one or two numbers. The numbers are always written down as words, and are always preceded by the procedural word "ARL". Throughout their transit via the Amateur radio National Traffic System, they retain this format and are only expanded to their plain-English meaning when delivered by a radio amateur. For example, "ARL FORTY SIX" would be typed in a letter or spoken over the phone to the addressee as "Greetings on your birthday and best wishes for many more to come." For those codes where customized text can be added, the customized text is added immediately following the number code word. For example, "ARL SIXTY TWO CHRISTMAS" is expanded upon delivery outside of the NTS system as "Greetings and best wishes to you for a pleasant Christmas holiday season."

The current list of numbered radiogram codes was expanded by Radio Relay International in 2024 and then adopted by the ARRL in 2025. It is backward compatible with older versions. The current list adds a variety of ARL Numbered Radiogram codes that support the RRI "I Am Safe" program along with additional texts designed to better support emergency communications operations and the RRI National Response Plan.

Codeword	Expansion
Group One—For Possible Relief Emergency Use	
ONE	Everyone safe here. Please don't worry.
TWO	Coming home as soon as possible.
THREE	Am in _____ hospital. Receiving excellent care and recovering fine.
FOUR	Only slight property damage here. Do not be concerned about disaster reports.
FIVE	Am moving to new location. Send no further mail or communication. Will inform you of new address when relocated.
SIX	Will contact you as soon as possible.
SEVEN	Please reply by Amateur Radio through the amateur delivering this message. This is a free public service.
EIGHT	Need additional _____ mobile or portable equipment for immediate emergency use.
NINE	Additional _____ radio operators needed to assist with emergency at this location.
TEN	Please contact _____. Advise to standby and provide further emergency information, instructions or assistance.
ELEVEN	Establish Amateur Radio emergency communications with _____ on _____ MHz.
TWELVE	Anxious to hear from you. No word in some time. Please contact me as soon as possible.
THIRTEEN	Medical emergency situation exists here.
FOURTEEN	Situation here becoming critical. Losses and damage from _____ increasing.
FIFTEEN	Please advise your condition and what help is needed.
SIXTEEN	Property damage very severe in this area.
SEVENTEEN	REACT communications services also available. Establish REACT communication with _____ on channel _____.
EIGHTEEN	Please contact me as soon as possible at _______.
NINETEEN	Request health and welfare report on _____. (State name, address and telephone number.)
TWENTY	Temporarily stranded. Will need some assistance. Please contact me at _____.
TWENTY ONE	Search and Rescue assistance is needed by local authorities here. Advise availability.
TWENTY TWO	Need accurate information on the extent and type of conditions now existing at your location. Please furnish this information and reply without delay.
TWENTY THREE	Report at once the accessibility and best way to reach your location.
TWENTY FOUR	Evacuation of residents from this area urgently needed. Advise plans for help.
TWENTY FIVE	Furnish as soon as possible the weather conditions at your location.
TWENTY SIX	Help and care for evacuation of sick and injured from this location needed at once.
TWENTY SEVEN	I am safe and well.
TWENTY EIGHT	Household safe and well.
TWENTY NINE	Currently at shelter.
THIRTY	Currently at home.
THIRTY ONE	Currently at family/friend's house.
THIRTY TWO	Currently at hotel.
THIRTY THREE	Safe but moving to a safer location.
THIRTY FOUR	Evacuating to a shelter.
THIRTY FIVE	Evacuating to family member/friend's house.
THIRTY SIX	Evacuating and safe.
THIRTY SEVEN	At home and plan to remain here.
THIRTY EIGHT	Will contact you when able.
THIRTY NINE	All communications are down.
FORTY	Share this message with others.
Group Two—Routine Messages	
FORTY SIX	Greetings on your birthday and best wishes for many more to come.
FORTY SEVEN	Reference your message number _____ to _____ delivered on _____ at _____ UTC.
FORTY EIGHT	Reference your message number _____ to _____ not delivered. Telephone _____ (insert number as received) inoperative. Please give better address.
FORTY NINE	Reference your message number _____ to _____ . Unable to contact addressee or receive confirmation of delivery.
FIFTY	Greetings by Amateur Radio.
FIFTY ONE	Greetings by Amateur Radio. This message is sent as a free public service by ham radio operators at _______. Am having a wonderful time.
FIFTY TWO	Really enjoyed being with you. Looking forward to getting together again.
FIFTY THREE	Received your _______. It's appreciated; many thanks.
FIFTY FOUR	Many thanks for your good wishes.
FIFTY FIVE	Good news is always welcome. Very delighted to hear about yours.
FIFTY SIX	Congratulations on your _______, a most worthy and deserved achievement.
FIFTY SEVEN	Wish we could be together
FIFTY EIGHT	Have a wonderful time. Let us know when you return.
FIFTY NINE	Congratulations on the new arrival. Hope mother and child are well.
SIXTY	Wishing you the best of everything on _______.
SIXTY ONE	Wishing you a very Merry Christmas and a Happy New Year.
SIXTY TWO	Greetings and best wishes to you for a pleasant _______ holiday season.
SIXTY THREE	Victory or defeat, our best wishes are with you. Hope you win.
SIXTY FOUR	Arrived safely at _______.
SIXTY FIVE	Arriving _______ on _______. Please arrange to meet me there.
SIXTY SIX	DX QSLs are on hand for you at the _______ QSL Bureau. Send _______ self addressed envelopes.
SIXTY SEVEN	Your message number _______ undeliverable because of _______. Please advise.
SIXTY EIGHT	Sorry to hear you are ill. Best wishes for a speedy recovery.
SIXTY NINE	Welcome to the _______. We are glad to have you with us and hope you will enjoy the fun and fellowship of the organization.
SEVENTY	Thank you for the QSO on _____ (frequency/band) _____ (mode) at _____ (time) _____ (date).
SEVENTY ONE	Order wire net established on _____ (frequency) to coordinate and prioritize access to _____ (digital network name) on _____ (frequency)_____ (mode).
SEVENTY TWO	Establish communications with _____ (name of EmComm group) on _____ frequency _____ mode.
SEVENTY THREE	Establish communications with _____ agency on channel _____ (spell channel number) _____ (mode).
SEVENTY FOUR	Establish communications with _____ agency on _____ (frequency) _____ mode.
SEVENTY FIVE	Priority Entry Point frequencies established on _____ (list frequencies and modes)
SEVENTY SIX	Point to point circuit established on _____ (frequency) ______ (mode). Please establish liaison.
SEVENTY EIGHT	SITREP messages requested every _____ (spell number) hours your location. Transmit to station _____ (call sign) in _____ (state/section).
SEVENTY NINE	WXOBS messages requested every _____ (spell number) hours your location. Transmit to station _____ (call sign) in _____ (state/section).
EIGHTY	OPRED messages requested your station. Update when changes occur. Transmit to station _____ (call sign) in _____ (state/section).
EIGHTY TWO	Digital Traffic Station connect/download frequency at _____ (spell number) minute intervals requested in support of disaster operations.
EIGHTY THREE	RRI Winlink gateway connect/download frequency at _____ (spell number) minute intervals requested in support of disaster operations.
EIGHTY FOUR	Request activate _____ Region Net until further notice.
EIGHTY FIVE	Request activate _____ Area Net until further notice.
EIGHTY SIX	Advise frequency and mode of ______ state/section nets.
EIGHTY SEVEN	Request assistance with establishment of a temporary message center at _____ (address and/or agency).
EIGHTY EIGHT	Welfare traffic being originated on (frequency/mode). Request assistance with RRI/NTS liaison
EIGHTY NINE	Priority and/or emergency traffic being originated on _____ (frequency/mode). Request assistance with RRI/NTS liaison.
NINETY	Please provide a list of stations operational on National SOS Radio Network.
NINETY ONE	Widespread disruptions to cellular data and public switched telephone network this location.
NINETY TWO	Widespread disruptions to Internet service this location.
NINETY THREE	The following broadcast stations are off-air in this area (list call sign, frequency/channel).
NINETY FOUR	Received your message ____ (number) for ____ (addressee) from _____ (station) _____ on _____ (date) _____ (time). Relayed/delivered to _____ (station) on _____ (date) _____ (time) via _____ (net/method) [Note: for use with handling instruction HXD]

== See also ==
- Amateur radio
- American Radio Relay League
- ARRL Radiogram
- National Traffic System
- Radio Relay International
- Radio Relay International "I Am Safe" Program
- RRI Publications Page
