= Walter P. Phillips =

American journalist, telegrapher and inventor (1846–1920)

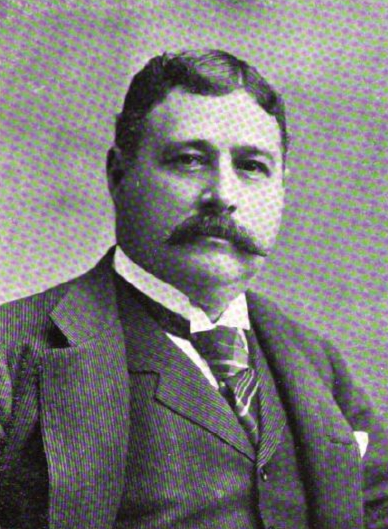
- Born: Walter Polk Phillips; June 14, 1846; Grafton, Massachusetts, US
- Died: January 31, 1920 (aged 73); Vineyard Haven, Massachusetts, (Note: Disputed, some sources report Oak Bluffs) US
- Occupations: Journalist; telegrapher; inventor
- Known for: His Phillips Code which included abbreviations POTUS and SCOTUS
- Spouse: Francena A. Capron (m. 1866; died 1914)
- Children: 1

Walter Polk Phillips (June 14, 1846 – January 31, 1920) was an American journalist, telegrapher, and inventor who compiled and expanded telegraph codes with his Phillips Code, a brevity code which included the abbreviations POTUS, for president of the United States, and SCOTUS, for Supreme Court of the United States. He later became the head of the United Press.

== Early life ==
Walter Polk Phillips was born in Grafton, Massachusetts, on June 14, 1846. He was the youngest of three children of Andrew S. and Roxanna M. Phillips. Little is known about his early years, but he did not have much schooling. He left school at age twelve and went to work on a farm. Several years later, in 1861, he was hired by the American Telephone and Telegraph Company (now known as AT&T) in Providence, Rhode Island, as a messenger. While living in Providence, he married Francena A. Capron on April 15, 1866. They had a son Albert C. Phillips, born on September 4, 1871.

== Early career ==
Phillips worked his way up in the American Telephone and Telegraph Company, and became known as an "expert telegrapher", respected for his speed in sending and receiving messages. By 1868, he was working for the Western Union Telegraph office in Providence, where his skill caught the attention of Samuel Morse. Phillips was the winner of several telegraphy contests; in one contest, he accurately transcribed more than 2,700 words in one hour, earning him a personal letter from Morse, along with a gift; the letter praised Phillips for his "dexterity" in the use of Morse code as well as his "faultless manner of recording" messages. In 1870, he became involved in journalism. He was named the managing editor of the Providence Morning Herald, where he worked for two years. He subsequently became editor of the Providence Morning Star. In 1871, he decided to start a newspaper in Attleborough, Massachusetts, the place where his wife was born. That newspaper, the Attleborough Chronicle, debuted on February 3, 1872. A year later, Phillips sold it for $5,000. Later in 1873, he and his family moved to New York City, where he was a reporter for The New York Sun, before being hired by the Associated Press to work in their New York office.

== Later career ==
Phillips worked for the Associated Press from 1875 to 1879, serving as the New York Bureau's assistant general manager. Most sources say that it was during this period of time (c. 1879) that he created what came to be known as the Phillips Code. It had become clear to him, as a veteran telegrapher and journalist, that certain words were frequently used in news dispatches; he compiled and expanded the system of abbreviations that would make sending and receiving news stories much easier.

Phillips explained that he was in large part putting down the collective experience of generations of telegraph operators. In the introduction to the 1907 edition of his book, "The Phillips Code: A Thoroughly Tested Method of Shorthand Arranged for Telegraphic Purposes. And Contemplating the Rapid Transmission of Press Reports; Also Intended to be Used as an Easily Acquired Method for General Newspaper and Court Reporting," Phillips wrote, "Research suggests that at one time, commercial telegraphs and railroads had numerical codes that contained at least 100 groupings. Few survived beyond the turn of the century. The compilation in this book represents the consensus of many whose duties brought them into close contact with this subject."

The Phillips code quickly became popular with newspaper telegraphers, and it soon became the standard at newspapers of that era. Also during this time, in July 1876, Phillips released a work of humor and social commentary, under the pen name John Oakum. Newspapers described it as "a collection of stories, character sketches and paragraphs" based on some of the telegraphers Phillips had known. Meanwhile, Phillips was next promoted to run the Associated Press's Washington, D.C. bureau, where he remained until 1882. He then returned to New York to take charge of one of Associated Press's newest wire service competitors, United Press. The press of his day referred to Phillips as the United Press's founding general manager, and praised him as "one of the leading news gatherers of the country."

== Final years ==
After working for the United Press, Phillips became president of the Columbia Graphophone Company, and resided in Bridgeport, Connecticut. After his wife of many years died in 1914, he relocated to Vineyard Haven, Massachusetts (some sources say Oak Bluffs). In poor health, with his vision failing, he died on January 31, 1920, at age 73. A controversy ensued after his death, when his relatives found he had left his secretary Frances Wood (who had also read to him and helped him stay up to date with the news) the sum of $100,000, making her the "sole legatee in his will".

== Selected works ==
- Walter Polk Phillips, Oakum Pickings, New York: W. J. Johnston, 1876 OCLC 2315321.
- Walter Polk Phillips, Sketches Old and New, J. H. Bunnell & company, 1897 OCLC 428925.
