= Amateur radio net =

Gathering of amateur radio operators

An amateur radio net, or simply ham net, is a radio net composed of amateur radio operators. Most nets convene on a regular schedule and specific frequency, and are organized for a particular purpose, such as relaying messages, discussing a common topic of interest, in severe weather (for example, during a Skywarn activation), emergencies, or simply as a regular gathering of friends for conversation.

== Net operation ==
Nets operate more or less formally depending on their purpose and organization. Groups of nets may organize and operate in collaboration for a common purpose, such as to pass along emergency messages in time of disaster. One such system of nets is the National Traffic System (NTS), organized and operated by members of the American Radio Relay League (ARRL) to handle routine and emergency messages on a nationwide and local basis.

=== Formal operation ===
A formal, or directed net has a single net control station (NCS) that manages its operation for a given session. The NCS operator calls the net to order at its designated start time, periodically calls for participants to join, listens for them to answer (or check in) keeps track of the roster of stations for that particular net session, and generally orchestrates the operation of the net.

A different station might be designated NCS for each net session. Overall operation and scheduling of NCS assignments and net sessions is managed by the net manager.

When a net covers a large geographic area, such as a continent or even the world, it becomes impractical for a single NCS to control. To cover a large scale area a net must operate on a frequency where signals can propagate long distances. Ironically, the same ability for long distance propagation leads to a situation where stations that are too close in proximity cannot hear each other. In this case two or more NCSs spaced geographically from one another can effectively collaborate to maintain contact with all possible participants.

A tactical net is a form of directed net in which stations are assigned tactical call signs to facilitate efficiency in message-handling, and are often more tightly controlled (by time, language, and protocol) than a regular radio net. During a tactical net, the participating stations are free to refer to other stations by their tactical designations, such as Medical One or Incident Command to relieve the caller of the burden of remembering or stumbling over legal call signs, which can impede net progress. Tactical call signs do not replace legal call signs, which stations involved must still announce at prescribed times.

=== Informal operation ===
An informal net may also have a net control station, but lack some or all of the formalities and protocols other than those used in non-net on-the-air operation; or, it could begin at the designated time and frequency in an ad hoc fashion by whoever arrives first. Club nets, such as ones for discussing equipment or other topics, use a NCS simply to control the order in which participants transmit their comments to the group in round-robin style.

== Types of nets ==
=== Traffic ===
Traffic nets operate primarily to relay formal written messages. For decades, amateur radio operators in the United States and Canada have traditionally passed both routine and emergency messages on behalf of others as part of the public-service mission allowed within the USA and Canadian government amateur radio regulations. The original organizational purpose of the American Radio Relay League or ARRL which was organized in the early 20th century (1914–15) was mainly for the purpose of relaying third party messages. In many parts of the world outside North America, it is illegal for amateur radio operators to pass messages on behalf of third parties.

Today, with inexpensive communication capability available to anyone, routine message handling has dwindled and is largely used for training purposes. During emergencies (such as natural disasters) – especially when normal communications channels are disabled or compromised – traffic nets (utilizing emergency-powered stations) are used to pass information into and out of affected areas.

=== DX ===
DX nets are organized to help amateur radio operators make contact with stations in distant locations or regions where amateur radio operators are scarce. By checking into a DX net, a ham could have a chance to contact another station they might otherwise not be likely to hear by randomly tuning across the amateur bands.

=== Club or Topic ===
Amateur radio clubs often organize nets to foster communication between members on a regular basis. These can be clubs based on geographic location or clubs formed around a special interest.

Special interest clubs or non-club groups often organize nets to enable discussions on a particular topic. A wide variety of such nets are in operation. One such example is nets that meet to discuss vintage or antique radio equipment. Another example is nets for using and discussing the AM mode of voice transmission.

== See also ==
- Amateur Radio on the International Space Station
- American Radio Relay League
- ARRL Radiogram
- National Traffic System
- Net operation
- Radiogram
