= Wire signal =

Type of Morse code operating signal used by Western Union

A wire signal is a brevity code used by telegraphers to save time and cost when sending long messages. The best-known code was the 92 Code adopted by Western Union in 1859. The code was designed to reduce bandwidth consumption over telegraph lines, thus speeding transmissions by utilizing a numerical code system for frequently used phrases.

== 92 Code ==
Several of the codes are taken from The Telegraph Instructor by G.M. Dodge. Dodge notes:

Other numerical signals are used by different railroads for different purposes, for instance, the signal “47” upon some railroads means “display signals”; while the signal “48” means “signals are displayed”. The numerals “9” and “12” are frequently used for “correct”. Other numerals are used for the different officials’ messages, agents’ messages, etc.

Codes that are not listed in the 1901 edition of Dodge are marked with an asterisk (*).

1*	Wait a minute.	25	Busy on another wire.
2	Very Important.	26*	Put on ground wire.
3*	What time is it?	27*	Priority, very important.
4	Where shall I go ahead?	28*	Do you get my writing?.
5	Anything? (Have you business for me?)	29*	Private, deliver in sealed envelope.
6*	I am ready.	30*	No more - the end.
7*	Are you ready?	31	Form 31 train order.
8	Close your key, stop breaking.	32*	I understand that I am to ....
9*	Priority business. Wire Chief's call.	33	Answer is paid.
10*	Keep this circuit closed.	34*	Message for all officers.
12*	Do you understand?	35*	You may use my signal to answer this.
13	Understand?	37*	Inform all interested.
14*	What is the weather?	39*	Important, with priority on through wire.
15*	For you and others to copy.	44*	Answer promptly by wire.
17*	Lightning here.	55	Important.
18	What's the trouble?	73	I wish you well (American); Best regards (British).
19	Form 19 train order.	77*	I have a message for you.
21*	Stop for meal.	88*	Love and kisses.
22	Wire test.	91*	Superintendent's signal.
23*	All stations copy.	92	Deliver Promptly.
24*	Repeat this back.	134*	Who is at the key?

In the above list, the numbers 19 and 31 refer to train order operations whereby messages from the dispatcher about changes in railroad routing and scheduling were written on paper forms. Form 19 was designed to be passed to the train as it went through a station at speed. Form 31 required hand delivery for confirmation.

=== Contemporary usage ===
Today, amateur radio operators still use codes 73 and 88 regularly, and -30- is used in journalism, as it was shorthand for "No more - the end". The Young Ladies Radio League uses code 33 to mean "love sealed with friendship and mutual respect between one YL [young lady] and another YL" or simply "hugs." A once-used but unofficial code 99 meant "go to hell." The other codes have mostly fallen into disuse.

== 1873 Telegraph Rules from the Lakeshore and Tuscarawas Valley Railway Company ==
The following code was taken from 1873 telegraph rulebook of the Lakeshore and Tuscarawas Valley Railway Company of Cleveland, Ohio.

1	Wait a minute.
2	Train Orders.
3	Give me the correct time
4	Where shall I go ahead?
5	Have you anything for me?
6	I have a message for you.
7	I have a message for you.
8	What is the matter?
9	Very important business; must take precedence.
10	Keep circuit closed.
12	How do you understand this?
13	I (or we) understand—
15	Inform all interested.
19	Ready for business.
20	Repeat this back to me.
21	Lightning troubles.
22	Busy on other circuit.
23	Have you report of—
24	My instrument works badly.
25	Did you get my writing?
44	Answer quick.
134	Who is at the key?

== See also ==
- Morse code abbreviations
- Phillips Code
