= Phillips Code =

Shorthand code used by news telegraph operators

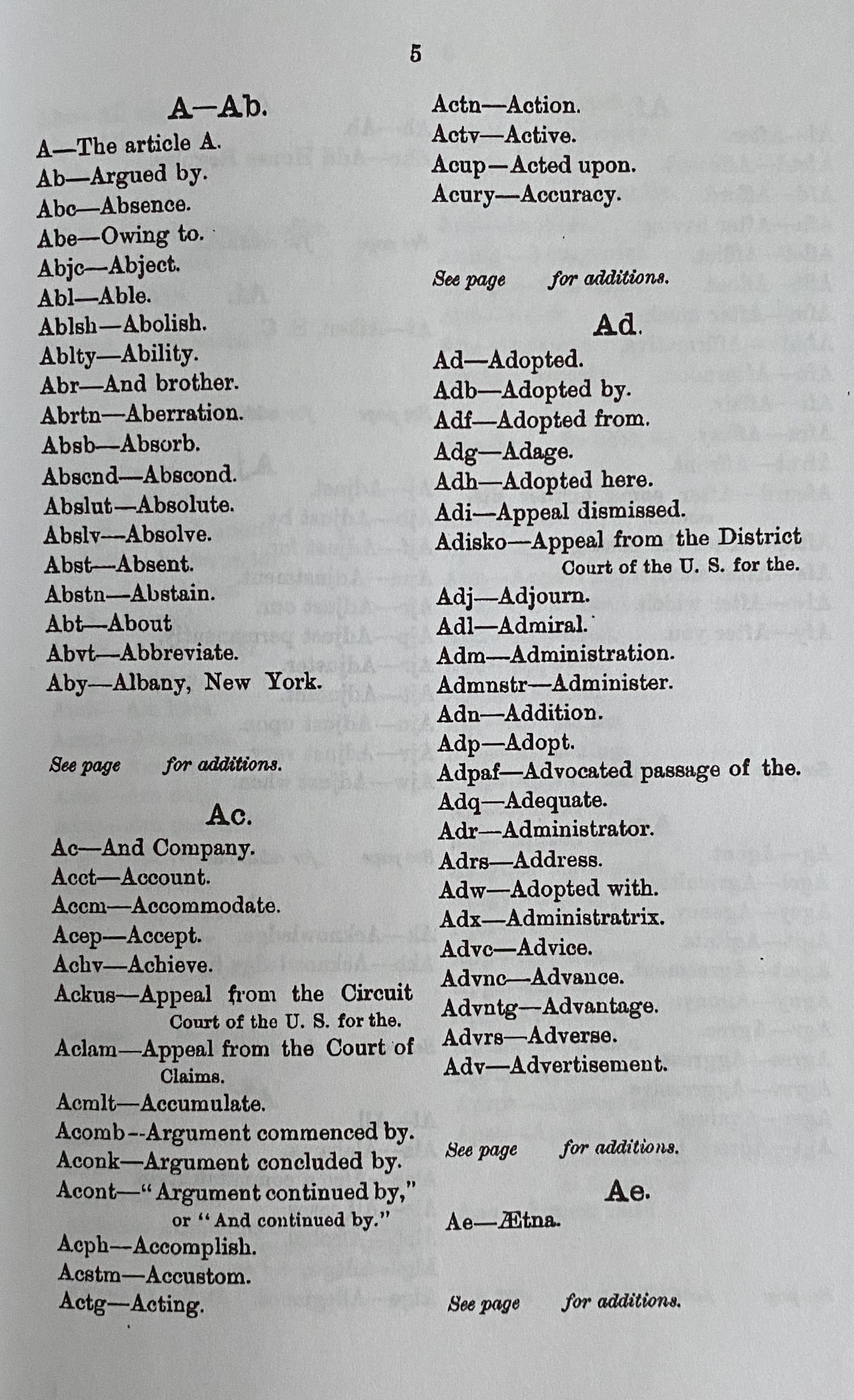
First page of the Phillips Code, 1879 edition

The Phillips Code is a brevity code (shorthand) compiled and expanded in 1879 by Walter P. Phillips (then of the Associated Press) for the rapid transmission of telegraph messages, including press reports. The code was a compilation of commonly used abbreviations in the field, with the aim of standardizing the most efficient terms. The final update to the code was published in 1925.

== Overview ==
It was compiled in 1879 by Walter P. Phillips, who explained that he was in large part putting down the collective experience of generations of telegraph operators. In the introduction to the 1907 edition of his book, "The Phillips Code: A Thoroughly Tested Method of Shorthand Arranged for Telegraphic Purposes. And Contemplating the Rapid Transmission of Press Reports; Also Intended to be Used as an Easily Acquired Method for General Newspaper and Court Reporting," Phillips wrote, "Research suggests that at one time, commercial telegraphs and railroads had numerical codes that contained at least 100 groupings. Few survived beyond the turn of the century. The compilation in this book represents the consensus of many whose duties brought them into close contact with this subject."

His code defined hundreds of abbreviations and initialisms for commonly used words that news authors and copy desk staff would commonly use. There were subcodes for commodities and stocks called the Market Code, a Baseball Supplement, and single-letter codes for Option Months. The last official edition was published in 1925.

The code consists of a dictionary of common words or phrases and their associated abbreviations. Extremely common terms are represented by a single letter (C: See; Y: Year); those less frequently used gain successively longer abbreviations (Ab: About; Abb: Abbreviate; Abty: Ability; Acmpd: Accompanied).

Later, The Evans Basic English Code expanded the 1,760 abbreviations in the Phillips Code to 3,848 abbreviations.

== Examples of use ==
Using the Phillips Code, this ten-word telegraphic transmission:

ABBG LG WORDS CAN SAVE XB AMTS MON AVOG FAPIB

expands to this:

Abbreviating long words can save exorbitant amounts of money, avoiding filing a petition in bankruptcy.

In 1910, an article explaining the basic structure and purpose of the Phillips Code appeared in various US newspapers and magazines. One example given is:

T tri o HKT ft mu o SW on Ms roof garden, nw in pg, etc.

which the article translates as:

The trial of Harry K. Thaw for the murder of Stanford White on Madison Square Roof Garden, now in progress, etc.

== Notable codes ==
The terms POTUS and SCOTUS originated in telegraph code, and are included in the Phillips code. SCOTUS appeared in the very first edition of 1879 and POTUS was in use by 1895, and was officially included in the 1923 edition. These abbreviations entered common parlance when news gathering services, in particular, the Associated Press, adopted the terminology.

Telegraph operators would often interleave Phillips Code with numeric wire signals that had been developed during the American Civil War era, such as the 92 Code. These codes were used by railroad telegraphers to indicate logistics instructions and they proved to be useful when describing an article's priority or confirming its transmission and receipt. This meta-data would occasionally appear in print when typesetters included the codes in newspapers, especially the code for "No more—the end", abbreviated as "- 30 -" on a typewriter.

== Excerpts of the codes ==
Example abbreviations of the Phillips Code
Code	Expansion
Hag	Haggle
Hz	Hazard
Igo	In consequence of
Kf	Confer
Kft	Conflict
Kpt	Compete
Oac	On account of
Ot	Owing to
Pcu	Preclude
Pkg	Packing
Pkj	Package
Pmnt	Prominent
Px	Price
Pxl	Political
Rept	Repeat
Rlav	Relative
Rpv	Representative
Sac	Senate Committee
Scf	Sacrifice
Sovy	Sovereignty
Spn	Suspicion
Thu	The house
Wam	Ways and means
_ _ _ _	Paragraph mark
Co	County
Dr	Doctor
Dx	Dash
Ea	Each
Ed	Editor
Eu	Europe
Fm	From
Gb	Great Britain
Gj	Grand Jury
Hc	Habeas corpus
Hf	Half
Hi	High
Kg	King
Ld	London
Lp	Liverpool
Lx	Pounds sterling
Mm	Mid-meridian (midnight)
Mo	Month
Mr	Mister
Oc	O'clock
Qm	Quartermaster
Ry	Railway
Sa	Senate
Ss	Steamship
Td	Treasury Department
Xm	Extreme
Za	Sea
Xg	Legislate
Xb	Exorbitant
ITC	In this connection
IQO	In consequence of
IAB	Introduced a bill
IAR	Introduced a resolution
HVNB	Have not been
Hur	House of Representatives
GX	Great excitement
GOH	Guest of honor
IWR	It was reported
IXJ	It is alleged
KAH	Knots an hour
CIC	Commander In Chief
UMPS	Umpires

== Editions ==
- 1879: The Phillips Telegraphic Code for the Rapid Transmission by Telegraph, published by Gibson Brothers Printers
- 1909 Market Supplement
- 1918 edition (implied by an article in the September 1923 edition of the Commercial Telegraphers' Journal, Volume 21)
- April 1, 1923, edited by E. E. Bruckner and published by Telegraph & Telephone Age.
- 1925

== See also ==
- Morse code
- Morse code abbreviations
- Wire signal
- Scribal abbreviation
- List of shorthand systems
