= ARRL Radiogram =

System of relaying formal traffic messages

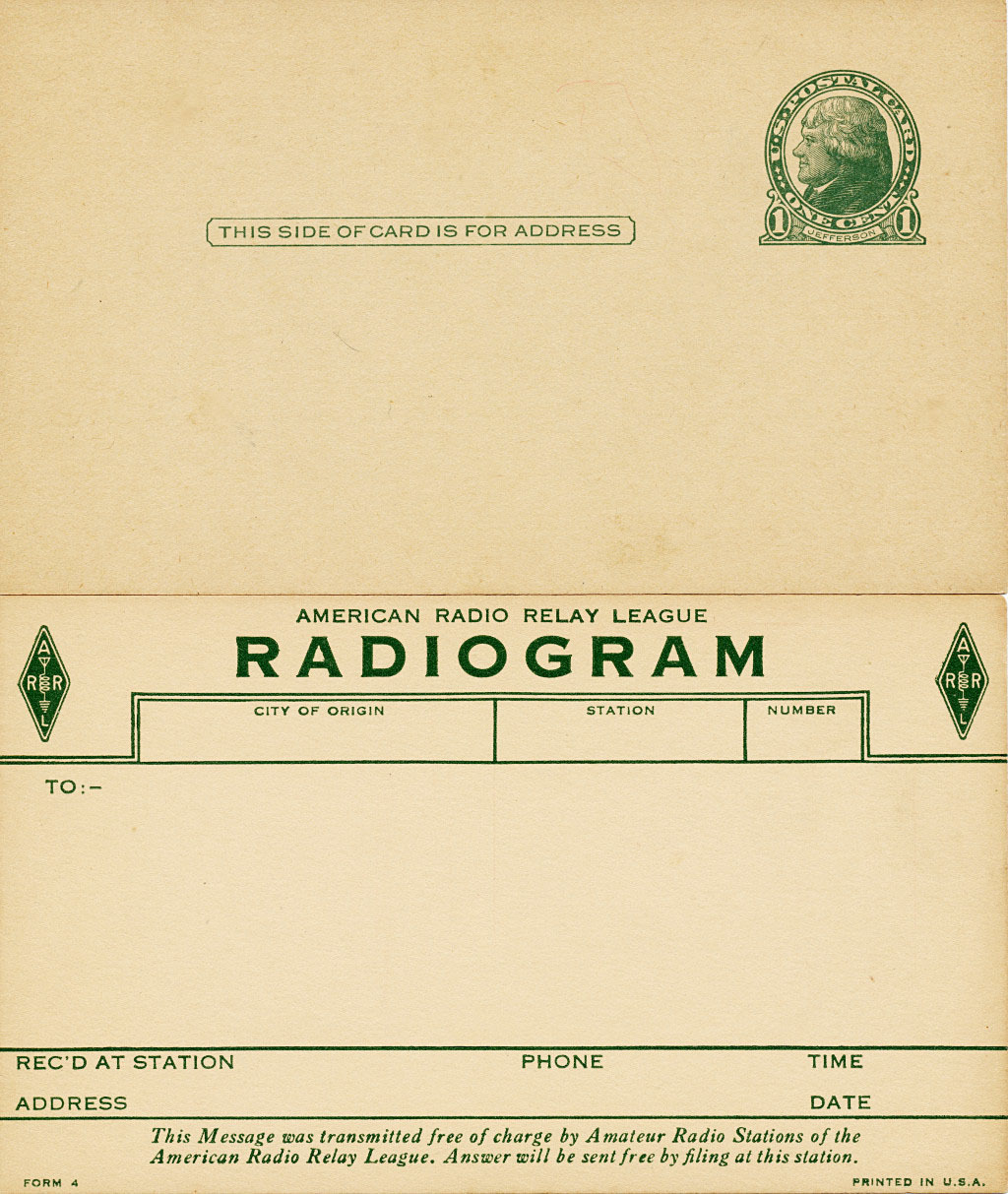
Historic ARRL radiogram form

An ARRL radiogram is an instance of formal written message traffic routed by a network of amateur radio operators through traffic nets, called the National Traffic System (NTS).

It is a plaintext message, along with relevant metadata (headers), that is placed into a traffic net by an amateur radio operator. Each radiogram is relayed, possibly through one or more other amateur radio operators, to a radio operator who volunteers to deliver the radiogram content to its destination.

Within the United States, amateur radio operators can send and deliver radiograms on behalf of any member of the general public; this is one type of "third-party traffic" that is specifically permitted by Federal Communications Commission (FCC) rules.

== Form overview ==
Radiogram forms facilitate a standard protocol between amateur radio operators, allowing much faster relay of formal messages. They do this by always having the message headers in a certain order, allowing operators to read and understand the headers without explicit verbal labels. This is especially important in hectic and stressful environments such as during a disaster, when many parties call upon radio operators to quickly transfer messages in and out of the affected areas.

A typical form has a place for the plaintext message, as well as for several headers that are important for routing the message to its proper destination in a timely manner. These fields include the message's priority, the callsign of the station of origin (the amateur radio operator who placed the message onto the message net), the date and time of origin, contact information of the message's recipient, as well as the callsign of the station that delivered the message.

The headers' purpose and order is logical and intuitive enough that many amateur radio operators have memorized it and in extremis can transmit and receive radiograms without referring to the form.

Current ARRL Radiogram

== Preamble part ==
All messages must have a preamble. The preamble of the message contains information about the message necessary to keep track of it as it passes through the amateur system. The parts of the preamble, except for the check as noted later, are not changed by any station relaying or delivering the message. They are permanent parts of the message created by the station of origin and must remain with the message all the way to the delivery point. Preamble information is used to service undeliverable messages and to generate replies to specific handling instructions.

=== Message number ===
The message number is selected by the station originating the message and it must be on all messages. It stays with the message all the way to the point of delivery. The delivering station may need to reply to the station of origin and refer to this number. Use number digits only, no letters, leading zeros, or dashes. Numbers are usually begun with 1 at the start of a year or month at the pleasure of the originating station.

=== Message precedence ===
Letter(s) used to indicate the precedence of the message, and must be on all messages. See the latest Precedence full definitions from ARRL (From ARRL FSD-3).

==== Precedences ====
PRECEDENCES (ARRL FSD-3, 2/94) EMERGENCY (Spelled out on form.): Any message having life and death urgency to any person or group of persons, which is transmitted by Amateur Radio in the absence of regular commercial facilities. This includes official messages of welfare agencies during emergencies requesting supplies, materials or instructions vital to relief of stricken populace in emergency areas. During normal times, it will be very rare. On CW/RTTY, this designation will always be spelled out. When in doubt, do not use it.

- EMERGENCY: Emergency is always spelled out in the preamble. Means other than Amateur Radio should be included in the delivery options. Emergency messages have immediate urgency. They should take priority over any other activity and should be passed by the best means available with the cooperation of all stations.
- PRIORITY (P): Use abbreviation P on CW/RTTY. This classification is for a) important messages having a specific time limit, b) official messages not covered in the emergency category, c) press dispatches and emergency related traffic not of the utmost urgency, d) notice of death or injury in a disaster area, personal or official.
- WELFARE (W): This classification, abbreviated as W on CW/RTTY, refers to either an inquiry as to the health and welfare of an individual in the disaster area or an advisory from the disaster area that indicates all is well. Welfare traffic is handled only after all emergency and priority traffic is cleared. The Red Cross equivalent to an incoming Welfare message is DWI (Disaster Welfare Inquiry).
- CERTIFIED (C): A certified message must be delivered within 48 hours of the time the message was drafted and tendered for origination. This is represented by the date and time of origin in the message header. The certified message must meet certain criteria regarding address data and message content.
- ROUTINE (R): Most traffic in normal times will bear this designation. In disaster situations, traffic labeled Routine (R on CW/RTTY) should be handled last, or not at all when circuits are busy with higher precedence traffic. ----- Notes: These precedences are not meant to prohibit handling lower level traffic until all higher levels are passed. Common sense dictates handling higher precedence traffic before lower when possible and/or outlets are available.
- EXERCISE MESSAGES: Messages in the ARRL format passed for test and exercise purposes may be given a precedence preceded by the word “TEST”, as in “TEST R”, “TEST P”, “TEST W”, or “TEST EMERGENCY”. It is customary to indicate within the text of such messages the words “TEST MESSAGE”, or “EXERCISE”. Using “EXERCISE” as the first and last groups of the text helps alert listeners to the nature of the content to avoid undue alarm. In some exercises, the life of the message may be terminated when the exercise period is terminated, i.e., any such messages are not handled after the exercise. Consult with the ARES/RACES/NTS group conducting the test to determine if such messages should be filed, handled and delivered afterwards to permit a full evaluation of the exercise.
- SERVICE MESSAGES: The precedence of a SVC message should be the same as that of the message being serviced. SVC ahead of a message number indicates a service message sent between stations relative to message handling, or delivery. Since they affect timely delivery, they are handled before routine messages. SVC is not a precedence

=== Handling instructions ===
OPTIONAL. Do not use handling instructions unless a particular need is present. Handling instructions are used to instruct the relaying and/or delivering operator to handle the message according to the following codes (Refer to ARRL CD 218, pink card.). If used, handling instructions must stay with the message to the point of delivery.

==== Handling instruction details ====
- HXA__ Delivery by email and/or text message preferred.
- HXB__ (Followed by number.) Cancel message if not delivered within [....] hours of filing time; service originating station.
- HXC Delivering station report date and time of delivery (TOD) to originating station. If received directly on the air by the addressee, then the addressee is responsible for the reply.
- HXD All stations handling this message report to originating station the identity of station from which received, plus date and time. Report identity of station to which relayed, plus date and time, or if delivered report date, time and method of delivery. During disasters or periods of high demand on circuit capacity, avoid using this instruction.
- HXE Delivering station get reply from addressee, originate message back. If received directly on the air by the addressee, then the addressee is responsible for the reply.
- HXF__ (Followed by a number.) Hold delivery until [date].
- HXG If postage or other expense involved, may cancel message and service originating station.
- HXI Please deliver as a radiogram-ICS-213 message.
- HXR Please confirm that the addressee has read the message and reply to originator. Reserved for Emergency, Priority and Certified precedence messages.
- HXT Special traffic test message, ID _____.

==== More than one HX code may be used ====
If more than one code is used, they may be combined provided no numbers are to be inserted, otherwise the HX should be repeated, thus: NR 27 R HXAC W1AW..., or, NR 27 R HXA50 HXC W1AW...(etc.).

=== Station of origin ===
The call sign of the amateur station originating (creating) the message for first introduction into the amateur system is the station of origin and must be on all messages. This call sign must stay with the message to the point of delivery. Service messages go to this station.

=== Check ===
The check is the number of word "groups" in the text of the message and must be used on all messages. This number is used by operators to verify that the text has been copied with the correct number of groups.

=== Place of origin ===
The PLACE OF ORIGIN is the location (city and state) of the party for whom the message is created, not necessarily the location of the station of origin.

=== Time filed ===
OPTIONAL. "TIME FILED" is used only when filing time has some importance relative to the precedence, handling instructions, or meaning in the text. TIME FILED is the time when the message is created by the station of origin. The time figures are in the 24-hour format followed by the letter "Z" to denote UTC time, or local time, as in "0215Z" or "2215EDT". Because NTS is an international system covering many time zones, UTC is the preferred time format, although it is acceptable to specify local time as "L", as in 2215L for messages intended to remain within a state or local area.

UTC (Z) date and time is customary on ARRL messages (an unmarked time is assumed to be UTC). To avoid ambiguity, mark the time with a Z, time zone designator, or L. Time and date must agree, that is be related to the same time zone.

The TIME FILED is normally omitted on routine traffic having no special time concerns. If used, the filing time must stay with the message to the point of delivery.

=== Month filed ===
Month must be used on all messages. (If TIME FILED is used, this date must agree with that time); This entry is the month in which the message is created and is written in the preamble as the three letter abbreviation: The month/day is assumed to be UTC unless marked otherwise by a time.

=== Day filed ===
The DAY FILED is the day of the month on which the message was originated and must be used on all messages. (If TIME FILED is used, the date and time must agree). That is, the new radio day starts at 0001 UTC. For example, a message originated on December 10 at 8:00 EST might have a time and date of 0101 UTC DEC 11. The day is written in figures only, no leading zeros.

== Address ==
The second section of the message is used to specify the name, address, city, state, zip, and telephone number of the addressee.

=== Addressee ===
Line 1 should contain the full name of the addressee and, if possible, it should be the name as it is most likely to be found in the local telephone directory at the point of delivery.

=== Street address ===
Line 2 is the street address (or institution name which might require an extra line in the address). Enter figures, street name (spell out east, west, north and south for clarity), and apartment or unit number. Sections of a city, as in SE or NW, are usually left abbreviated.

=== City, state, zip ===
The CITY, STATE (using standard two letter abbreviations), and ZIP code are entered without punctuation. NINE DIGIT ZIPs are written with a spelled DASH, i.e. OWINGS MILLS MD 21117 DASH 2345

=== Telephone number ===
Telephone numbers are written as three groups of digits with no punctuation; area code, exchange, and number (only two groups if the area code is not required): 212 555 3245, or 555 1200 (note no hyphens used)

=== eMail Address ===
The latest version of the Radiogram has a space for eMail address of the recipient.

=== Address op note ===
An OP NOTE may be inserted after the telephone figures, before the text, relating to handling and/or delivery matters. The words “OP NOTE” are used to introduce this information when transmitting the message. OP NOTEs are optional, and are generally not considered part of the message to be delivered to the addressee. They are primarily for use by the handling operators. For example, the following address with OP NOTE relates to when to attempt delivery by telephone:

DONALD R SMITH
164 EAST SIXTH AVENUE
RIVER CITY MD 00789
301 555 3470
OP NOTE WORKDAY ONLY

=== Messages for other services ===
Messages which must be re-filed with other systems, such as MARS or RACES, may require additional information such as rank, unit information, APO, etc. Find out what is required by consulting an operator in that system before accepting the message so that you are prepared to ask for what is needed.

== Text part ==
The text contains the actual message information authorized by the person for whom the message was originated. Note that the amateur does not originate messages for a person without permission from that person! The text is entered in section 3 of the message form. (When transmitting a message, the text is separated from the preceding address, and the signature to follow, by the use of the word "BREAK" on voice, the prosign <BT> on CW, to allow the receiving operator to know its beginning and end. BREAK and <BT> are not counted as groups.) The text is divided into word "groups", five or ten to a line for easy counting, and is usually limited to 25 words or less.

=== Punctuation ===
PUNCTUATION characters are not used in the text except as follows:

==== / ====
The slash, "/", is used to separate characters within a group, as in 304/BA. Since the “/” is part of the group it does not qualify as a separate group for the check. Although usually not used as a group by itself (a space on the left and on the right), if so used it would be counted in the check.

==== X ====
The letter "X" used to denote a period. The letter "X" is never used as the last group of the text. The “X” is a separate group and is counted for the check. In a radiogram transmitted by voice, the character is read using the phonetic "X-ray."

==== R ====
The letter "R" is used in place of a decimal in mixed figure groups, as in 7013R5 (7013.5), or 146R670 (146.670). Since the “R” is part of the group it does not qualify as a separate group for the check. (The inclusion of the “R” makes the group a “mixed group” for transmission on voice.)

==== Other punctuation ====
OTHER PUNCTUATION is spelled out (in order to avoid confusion with prosigns used in the transmission of the message) as in "QUERY" for a question, "DASH" to separate special number or mixed groups, "EXCLAMATION", "COMMA", etc. (Hyphens are not used in telephone number groups or anywhere else in the text.) Such punctuation words are separate groups and are counted for the check.

=== ARRL Numbered Radiograms ===
For commonly sent messages, and for efficiency during times of radio congestion, the ARRL Numbered Radiogram brevity code may be employed. This assigns full sentences to each of 48 different numbers, which are spelled out in the message and preceded by the procedure word "ARL". For example, "ARL FORTY SIX" is the brevity code for "Happy birthday", and is expanded upon delivery outside of the NTS system to "Greetings on your birthday and best wishes for many more to come.". For purposes of the word count, "ARL FORTY SIX" is three words, and is never written down as "ARL 46".

=== Salutations ===
Words like "love" and "regards", often associated with signatures in formal letters, are put in the text in amateur messages (not in the signature).

=== Counting word groups for the check ===
The number value to be entered in the "CHECK" in the preamble of the message is the total number of “groups” in the text between the start and end prosigns (but not counting the prosigns). An easy rule to remember about counting word groups:

Any group of one or more consecutive characters, with no interrupting spaces and with a space before it and after it, is counted as one “group”.

Such a group may be all letters, all numbers, or any mix of numbers, letters, or slashes (/), so long as there are no spaces within the group. Each word, group of connected digits, connected mixed characters, spelled punctuation word, “X”, or ARL constitutes one group for the purpose of calculating the total count to enter in the check section of the preamble. The prosigns "BREAK", or <BT> on CW, at the start and end of the text are not counted.

== Signature part ==
=== Signature ===
The signature of the message is the name of the person for whom the message is created (not necessarily the station of origin), and any other information that person wishes to include (such as address, telephone number, title, etc.). The Place-of-Origin given in the Preamble is the location of this individual.

Words like love and regards, often associated with signatures in formal letters, are put in the text in amateur messages.

Amateur call signs, titles, QCWA or OOTC numbers, etc., in the signature follow the name on the same line.

Addresses for the signing party are optionally included (upon request) on subsequent lines, exactly as done in the address section, but are included only if important to the originator, message purpose, or replying. Since most addressees know the party from whom messages originate, most messages in daily NTS service have simple one-line signatures.

Messages for served agencies, particularly during disasters, generally require an authorizing signature in full. Messages without same may be refused. It is important for originating stations to get full information about persons for whom messages are originated in order to be able to re-contact them should a problem arise in the delivery of their message, or if a reply is received.

=== Signature op note ===
An OP NOTE may be inserted after the SIGNATURE, before the end of the message, relating to reply and/or servicing matters. The words “OP NOTE” are used to introduce this information when transmitting the message. OP NOTEs are optional, and are generally not considered part of the message to be delivered to the addressee; they are primarily for use by the operators handling it.

== See also ==
- Radiogram (message)
- Message precedence
- National Traffic System
- American Radio Relay League
- Radio Relay International
