= ACP 131 =

Defines Allied Military brevity codes

ACP-131 is the controlling publication for the listing of Q codes and Z codes. It is published and revised from time to time by the Combined Communications Electronics Board (CCEB) countries: Australia, New Zealand, Canada, United Kingdom, and United States. When the meanings of the codes contained in ACP-131 are translated into various languages, the codes provide a means of communicating between ships of various nations, such as during a NATO exercise, where there is no common language.

== History ==
The original edition of ACP-131 was published by the U.S. military during the early years of radio telegraphy for use by radio operators using Morse Code on continuous wave (CW) telegraphy. It became especially useful, and even essential, to Wireless radio operators on both military and civilian ships at sea before the development of advanced single-sideband telephony in the 1960s.

== Reason for the codes ==
Radio communications, prior to the advent of landlines and satellites as communication paths and relays, was always subject to unpredictable fade outs caused by weather conditions, practical limits on available emission power at the transmitter, radio frequency of the transmission, type of emission, type of transmitting antenna, signal waveform characteristics, modulation scheme in use, sensitivity of the receiver and presence, or lack of presence, of atmospheric reflective layers above the earth, such as the E-layer and F-layers, the type of receiving antenna, the time of day, and numerous other factors.

Because of these factors which often resulted in limiting periods of transmission time on certain frequencies to only several hours a day, or only several minutes, it was found necessary to keep each wireless transmission as short as possible and still get the message through. This was particularly true of CW radio circuits shared by a number of operators, with some waiting their turn to transmit.

As a result, an operator communicating by radio telegraphy to another operator, wanting to know how the other operator was receiving the signal, could send out a message on his key in Morse Code stating, "How are you receiving me?"

▄ ▄ ▄ ▄ ▄▄▄ ▄▄▄ ▄▄▄ ▄ ▄▄▄ ▄▄▄ ▄ ▄▄▄ ▄ ▄▄▄ ▄ ▄ ▄▄▄ ▄ ▄▄▄ ▄▄▄ ▄▄▄ ▄▄▄ ▄▄▄ ▄ ▄ ▄▄▄ ▄ ▄▄▄ ▄ ▄ ▄▄▄ ▄ ▄▄▄ ▄ ▄ ▄ ▄ ▄ ▄ ▄ ▄▄▄ ▄ ▄ ▄▄▄ ▄ ▄▄▄ ▄▄▄ ▄ ▄▄▄ ▄▄▄ ▄ ▄ ▄ ▄▄▄ ▄▄▄ ▄ ▄

Using ACP-131 codes, the question could be phrased simply "I̅N̅T̅ QRK"

▄ ▄ ▄▄▄ ▄ ▄▄▄ ▄▄▄ ▄▄▄ ▄ ▄▄▄ ▄ ▄▄▄ ▄ ▄▄▄ ▄ ▄▄▄

resulting in much more efficient use of circuit time.

If the receiver hears the sender in a "loud and clear" condition, the response would be "QRK 5":

▄▄▄ ▄▄▄ ▄ ▄▄▄ ▄ ▄▄▄ ▄ ▄▄▄ ▄ ▄▄▄ ▄ ▄ ▄ ▄ ▄

All of which requires less circuit time and less "pounding" on the key by the sending operators.

Should the receiving operator not understand the sending operator, the receiving operator would send "?"

▄ ▄ ▄▄▄ ▄▄▄ ▄ ▄

or the marginally shorter I̅N̅T̅

▄ ▄ ▄▄▄ ▄ ▄▄▄

The other operator would respond again with:

▄ ▄ ▄▄▄ ▄ ▄▄▄ ▄▄▄ ▄▄▄ ▄ ▄▄▄ ▄ ▄▄▄ ▄ ▄▄▄ ▄ ▄▄▄

which is much easier than retransmitting "How are you receiving me?"

If the receiving operator understood the sending operator, the receiving operator would say the word "ROGER" or "MESSAGE RECEIVED", or send the short form "R"

▄ ▄▄▄ ▄

"R" and "?" are similarly structured, but very easy to distinguish.

== Applicability of the codes ==
According to ACP-125(F), paragraphs 103 and 104, in radio communication among Allied military units:

- Q codes are authorized for both civilian and military use, and for communications between the two.
- Z codes are authorized for use only among military stations.

Applicability of codes by medium
Mil./Civ.	Medium type	Q codes?	Z codes?
Civilian	continuous wave radio (CW)	Q codes	
Military	continuous wave radio (CW)	Q codes	Z codes
Civilian	shipboard signal lamp	Q codes	
Military	shipboard signal lamp	Q codes	Z codes
Military	flag semaphore	Q codes	Z codes
Military	teletype (Note: Military teleprinters use Z codes for routing instructions in the message header.)		Z codes

== Voice transmission ==
Some assert that the use of Q codes and Z codes was not intended for use on voice circuits, where plain language was speedy and easily recognizable, especially when employing the character recognition system in use at the time, such as ALPHA, BRAVO, CHARLIE, etc. However, in military communication the latter are still in use.

A typical simplex military voice exchange:

Sender → Receiver	Question / response	Message
C2 → L5	Q	Lima five this is Charlie two: Radio check. Over.
L5 → C2	R	Lima five: Roger. Over.
C2 → L5	R	Charlie two: Roger. Out.

However, some voice operators, such as amateur radio operators, find it convenient or traditional to carry over some of the Q codes to voice ("phone") exchanges, such as "QSL", "QRK", "QTH", etc.

== See also ==
- 500 kHz – Maritime radio frequency
- Continuous wave – Electromagnetic wave that is not pulsed
- Morse code – Transmission of language with brief pulses
- Q code – Type of Morse code operating signal
- Radio – Use of radio waves for communication
- Z code – Morse code operating signal of the US Army / NATO
