= National Traffic System =

Visual representation of traffic passing of ARRL radiograms between various nets, from Wisconsin to California.

The National Traffic System (NTS) is an organized network of amateur radio operators sponsored by the American Radio Relay League for the purpose of relaying messages throughout the U.S. and Canada.

During normal times, these messages are routine greetings ("Happy birthday Aunt Mary") and keep the system well oiled and the operators trained so that everything works when needed. When there is an emergency or disaster, NTS works closely with the Amateur Radio Emergency Service to provide emergency communications. The most common types of disaster-related messages are "health and welfare" inquiries and notifications into and out of the area affected by the disaster.

In time of disaster, it is easy to expand the system by simply creating additional meeting times for the nets with high volume, or by setting up a specific "trunk line" between two points.

== History ==
Traffic passing by formal relay (via amateur radio) originates from the founding of the American Radio Relay League. The NTS as it exists today was first outlined by George Hart, W1NJM (died 24 March 2013) in "New National Traffic Plan: ARRL Maps New Traffic Organization for All Amateurs" as part of the September 1949 issue of QST. While traffic passing between amateur radio operators was nothing new, Hart's system extended coverage of traffic capability in a uniform manner across the U.S. and Canada, creating formal section and area nets devoted to handling NTS-organized traffic.

In April 2022, the ARRL chartered a project, NTS 2.0, to refresh procedures and standards to remain relevant to contemporary Emergency Communications services.

== Organizational structure ==
NTS is defined using geographic areas. The U.S. is divided into areas that approximate time zones. Areas are divided into regions, and regions into sections that correspond to a state. Each of these subdivisions has nets for collecting and distributing traffic. A net is nothing more than a time of day and a radio frequency where the appropriate group of amateur operators can meet to send the messages on their way. ARRL Radiogram traffic typically begins and ends its journey at local nets, often through nearby repeaters. Local nets typically involve city or county-wide coverage on VHF (2-metre band) or UHF (70 cm band), and although the ARRL does not endorse a single mode for traffic passing, messages are typically relayed by voice at this level.

Representatives from section nets relay traffic collected from local nets up to the appropriate region net, or relay to a nearby section for further delivery. Messages are exchanged between section and region representatives, which are then passed to area nets, the highest level in the system. Nets at these upper levels usually take place on HF band modes for their distance capabilities (e.g. 20 or 10 metres) and can be passed by voice, CW, digital, and even packet modes.

As traffic trickles back down through the area, region, section, and local nets, messages are typically delivered via a local telephone call, depending on handling instructions. Messages can also be delivered by hand or via message carrier, including the postal service, however Part 97 dictates that ham radio operators cannot receive financial restitution for their service. If a message is undeliverable, handling instructions may dictate that a service message be originated back to the sending station.

== Traffic passing ==
Sample Radiogram
ARRL-formatted radiogram being originated in a local net on the WA4TSC repeater, 2013-07-11 19:30 ET. This is a service message bound for Franklin, Tennessee.

The original message was: "ARL SIXTY SEVEN 1 PAUL K4MSG TELEPHONE NOT IN SERVICE X POSTED EMAIL ON K4MSG FACEBOOK X 73's MORGAN K4RHD"

Later corrected to: ARL SIXTY SEVEN 1 PAUL K4MSG TELEPHONE 5408822745 NOT IN SERVICE X POSTED EMAIL ON K4MSG FACEBOOK X 73's MORGAN K4RHD"

Which, when interpreted with the ARL message 67: "Your message number 1 was undeliverable because of Paul K4MSG telephone 5408822745 not in service. Posted email on K4MSG facebook. Signature: 73's Morgan K4RHD"

This process is best explained by an example. Let's say that someone in Wisconsin wants to send a birthday greeting to Aunt Mary in California. They telephone their local ham friend and give him the message.

- At 6:30 local time, the Wisconsin ham attends ("checks into") the Wisconsin Section net. One station there has been designated to accept all outgoing messages, and Aunt Mary's message is sent to that station.
- At 7:45, the station who received the message checks into the Region net. This net consists of representatives from all the section nets in the region, and one station has been designated to accept all traffic that flows out of the region. Aunt Mary's greeting will be sent to this station.
- At 8:30, the station from the region checks into the Area net and sends Aunt Mary's greeting to the designated representative from the Pacific area.
- At 8:30 Pacific Time, the Pacific Area net meets. (All the area nets meet at 8:30 local time; since they are in different time zones there is no overlap.) At this point the process is repeated in the opposite order
  - The area representative sends the message to the appropriate region representative,
  - The region representative meets a later session of the region net and sends the message to the appropriate section representative,
  - The section representative meets a later section net and sends the message to the closest operator to Aunt Mary's home
- The final recipient calls Aunt Mary on the telephone and delivers the greeting.

Perhaps this sounds rather complex, but it really is not. Each net uses the same procedure and operating techniques, so as novice operators gain experience they can "graduate" from section to region to area nets. Every message is placed into the same format. The operation is disciplined but not unduly complex.

== See also ==
- ARRL Radiogram
- Morse code
- NATO phonetic alphabet
- Packet radio
- Prosigns for Morse code
- Winlink
