= Radiogram (message) =

Formal written message transmitted by radio

A radiogram is a formal written message transmitted by radio. Also known as a radio telegram or radio telegraphic message, radiograms use a standardized message format, form and radiotelephone and/or radiotelegraph transmission procedures. These procedures typically provide a means of transmitting the content of the messages without including the names of the various headers and message sections, so as to minimize the time needed to transmit messages over limited and/or congested radio channels. Various formats have been used historically by maritime radio services, military organizations, and Amateur Radio organizations.

Radiograms are typically employed for conducting record communications, which provides a message transmission and delivery audit trail. Sometimes these records are kept for proprietary purposes internal to the organization sending them, but are also sometimes legally defined as public records. For example, maritime Mayday/SOS messages transmitted by radio are defined by international agreements as public records.

== Historical development ==
From 1850 to the mid 20th century industrial countries used the electric telegraph as a long distance person-to-person text message service. A telegraph system consisted of two or more geographically separated stations linked by wire supported on telegraph poles. A message was sent by an operator in one station tapping on a telegraph key, which sent pulses of current from a battery or generator down the wire to the receiving station, spelling out the text message in Morse code. At the receiving station the current would activate a telegraph sounder which would produce a series of audible clicks, and a receiving operator who knew Morse code would translate the clicks to text and write down the message. By the 1870s, most industrial nations had nationwide telegraph networks with telegraph offices in most towns, allowing citizens to send a message called a telegram for a fee to any person in the country. Submarine telegraph cables allowed intercontinental messages called cablegrams.

The invention of radiotelegraphy (wireless telegraphy) communication around 1900 allowed telegraph signals to be sent by radio. An operator at a radio transmitter would tap on a telegraph key, turning the transmitter on and off, sending pulses of radio waves through the air, and at the receiving station a radio receiver would receive the pulses and make them audible as a sequence of beeps in the earphone, and the receiving operator would translate the Morse code to text and write it down. High speed systems used paper tape to send and record the message. Guglielmo Marconi's demonstration of transatlantic radiotelegraphy transmission in 1901 showed that the wireless telegraph could be a useful long-distance communication technology which didn't require the costly installation of a telegraph wire. Around 1906 industrial nations began building powerful transoceanic radiotelegraphy stations to communicate with other countries and their overseas colonies. By World War I these were integrated with landline telegraph networks, so citizens could go to a telegraph office and send a person-to-person telegraph message by radio to another country. This was written down on a standardized form called a radiogram. International radiotelegraphy was expensive so radiograms were mostly used for business and commercial communication.

The concept of the standard message format originated in the wired telegraph services. Each telegraph company likely had its own format, but soon after radio telegraph services began, some elements of the message exchange format were codified in international conventions (such as the International Radiotelegraph Convention, Washington, 1927), and these were then often duplicated in domestic radio communications regulations (such as the FCC in the U.S.) and in military procedure documentation.

Military organizations independently developed their own procedures, and in addition to differing from the international procedures, they sometimes differed between different branches of the military within the same country.

For example, the publication "Communication Instructions, 1929", from the U.S. Navy Department, includes:

- One procedure for messages transmitted "in naval form over nonnaval systems" (Part II: Radio, Chapter 15)
- One procedure for exchanging messages with commercial radio stations (Part II: Radio, Chapter 16, pages 36–37 for examples; see also Part I: Chapter 7)
- One procedure for messages transmitted within the Navy (Part IV: Procedure and Examples, Chapter 32, especially pages 21 & 22 for the format)
- One format for exchanging messages between the Army and Navy (Part IV: Appendix A), called the "Joint Army and Navy Radiotelegraph Procedure", with the format shown on page 70.

Notable characteristics of radiograms include headers that include information such as the from and to addresses, date and time filed, and precedence (e.g. emergency, priority, or routine), so that the radio operators can determine which messages need to be delivered first during times of congestion.

=== Chronology of the commercial radiogram format ===
- International Telegraph Conference (London, 1903; including Order of transmission beginning on page 40)
- International Telegraph Conference (Paris, 1925)
- International Radiotelegraph Convention (Washington, 1927)
- International Radiotelegraph Conference (Madrid, 1932) was redrafted to include general principles common to telegraph, telephone and radio services.

== Maritime radio service radiotelegrams ==
The message format for communications transmitted to sea-going vessels is defined in Rec. ITU-R M.1171, § 28:

1. radiotelegram begins: from . . . (name of ship or aircraft);
2. number . . . (serial number of radiotelegram);
3. number of words . . . ;
4. date . . . ;
5. time . . . (time radiotelegram was handed in aboard ship or aircraft);
6. service indicators (if any);
7. address . . . ;
8. text . . . ;
9. signature . . . (if any);
10. radiotelegram ends, over

== Airline Teletype Message ==
The international airline industry continues to use a radioteletype message format originally designed for transmission to Teleprinters, Airline Teletype System, which is now disseminated via e-mail and other modern electronic formats. However, the relationship of the IATA Type B message to other radio telegram message formats is clearly visible in a typical message:

QD AAABBCC
.XXXYYZZ 111301
ASM
UTC
27SEP03899E001/TSTF DL Y
NEW
BA667/13APR
J 319 C1M25VVA4C26
LHR1340 BCN1610
LHRQQQ 99/1
QQQBCN 98/A
QQQQQQ 906/PAYDIV B
LHRQQQ 999/1
QQQBCN 998/A
SI

== Military radiograms ==
Military organizations have historically used radiograms for transmitting messages. One notable example is the notification of the air raid on Pearl Harbor that brought the United States into World War II.

The standard military radiogram format (in NATO allied nations) is known as the 16-line message format, for the manner in which a paper message form is transcribed through voice, Morse code, or TTY transmission formats. Each format line contains pre-defined content.

When sent as an ACP-126 message over teletype, a 16-line format radiogram would appear similar to this:

RFHT
DE RFG NR 114
R 151412Z MAR
FM CG FIFTH CORPS
TO CG THIRD INFDIV
WD GRNC
BT
UNCLAS
PLAINDRESS SINGLE ADDRESS
MESSAGES WILL BE TRANSMITTED
OVER TELETIPWRITER <!-- sic --> CIRCUITS
AS INDICATED IN THIS EXAMPLE
BT
C WA OVER TELETYPEWRITER
NNNN

Some of the format lines in the above example have been omitted for efficiency. The translation of this abbreviated format follows:

Format Line	Message Text	Explanation
Line 2	RFHT	Station being called, which will receive the message
Line 3	DE RFG NR 114	Sent by radio station having the callsign RFG, station serial number 114
Line 5	R 151412Z MAR	Routine precedence, March 15, 2:12pm UTC in Date-time group format
Line 6	FM CG FIFTH CORPS	The message is from CG FIFTH CORPS
Line 7	TO CG THIRD INFDIV	The message is to CG THIRD INFDIV
Line 10	WD GRNC	Accounting symbol (WD); word groups have not been counted (GRNC)
Line 11	BT	Section separator between heading and text
Line 12	UNCLAS PLAINDRESS SINGLE ADDRESS MESSAGES WILL BE TRANSMITTED OVER TELETIPWRITER CIRCUITS AS INDICATED IN THIS EXAMPLE	Message content is unclassified, and the message is...
Line 13	BT	Section separator between text and the ending
Line 15	C WA OVER TELETYPEWRITER	corrects (C) word after (WA) "OVER" to "TELETYPEWRITER"
Line 16	NNNN	end-of-message indicator

This radiotelegraph message format (also "radio teletype message format", "teletypewriter message format", and "radiotelephone message format") and transmission procedures have been documented in numerous military standards, including the World War II-era U.S. Army Manuals TM 11-454 (The Radio Operator), FM 24-5 (Basic Field Manual, Signal Communication), FM 24-6 (Radio Operator's Manual), TM 1-460 (Radiotelephone Procedure), FM 24-18 (Radio Communication), FM-24-19 (Radio Operator's Handbook), FM 101-5-2 (U.S. Army Report and Message Formats), TM 11-380, FM 11-490-7 (Military Affiliate Radio System), AR 105–75, Navy Department Communication Instructions 1929, and their modern decedents in the Allied Communications Procedures, including ACP 124 (messages relayed by telegraphy), ACP 125 (messages relayed by voice), ACP 126 (messages relayed by radio teletype), ACP 127 (messages relayed by automated tape), AR 25–6, U.S. Navy Signalman training courses and others.

At one point before World War II, the U.S. FCC defined (at least for domestic police radio traffic) a station serial number as a sequential message number that was reset at the beginning of each calendar month.

The Communications Standard Dictionary defines radiotelegraph message format as "The prescribed arrangement of the parts of a message that has been prepared for radiotelegraph transmission."

== MARS radiograms ==
The Military Affiliate Radio System uses radiograms, or MARSgrams, to transmit health & welfare message between military members and their families, and also for emergency communications. Some MARS radio procedure documents include instructions on how to exchange ARRL NTS Radiograms over a MARS radio net. Both formats include a procedure for counting the number of word groups (words in NTS, groups in the ACP/MARS format), but differ in how word groups are counted, for instance, so the counting method must be resolved when converting messages between formats.

== U.S. Department of State ACP-127 radiograms ==
The U.S. Department of State uses the military's automated message delivery version of the 16-line format, known as ACP-127, with its own structured definitions of the format lines.

== Police Radiogram ==
Police radiograms had their own format, likely derived from the commercial radiogram format.

Example radiogram from A National Training Manual and Procedural Guide for Police and Public Safety Radio Communications Personnel, 1968.

15 SHRF LEE COUNTY ILL 12-20-66 (A. Preamble)
PD CARBONDALE ILL (B. Address)
DATA AND DISPOSITION RED 62 CHEVROLET (C. Text)
4 DOOR ILL LL1948 VIN 21723T58723
ABANDONED DIXON ILLINOIS THREE DAYS
HELD ANDREWS GARAGE FRONT END DAMAGED
NOT DRIVEABLE NO APPREHENSIONS WILL
BE RELEASED TO OWNER ON PROOF OF
OWNERSHIP
SHERIFF LEE COUNTY
ILLINOIS JRM 1530 CST (D. Signature)

=== Section A6.6 Message Form ===
From the above training manual:

A formal message is one constructed, transmitted and recorded according to a standard prescribed form (see Sec. 4). A formal message should contain the following essential P A R T S:

1. Preamble - message number, point of origin or agency identifier, date.
2. Address - to whom the message is directed.
3. Reference - to previous message, if any.
4. Text - the message.
5. Signature or Authority - department requesting the message.

== ARRL radiogram ==
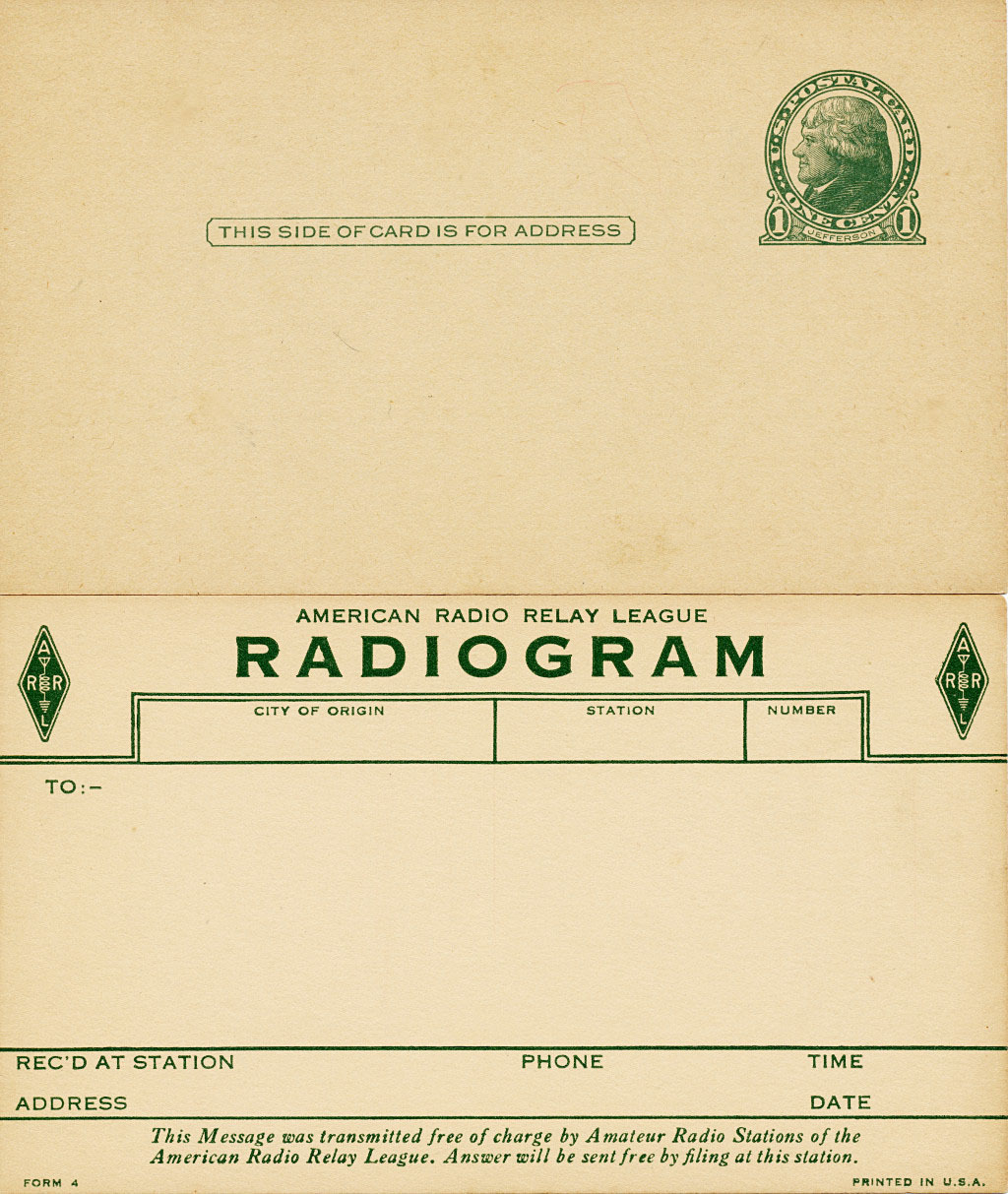
historic ARRL radiogram form

An ARRL radiogram is an instance of formal written message traffic routed by a network of amateur radio operators through traffic nets, called the National Traffic System (NTS).

It is a plaintext message, along with relevant metadata (headers), that is placed into a traffic net by an amateur radio operator. Each radiogram is relayed, possibly through one or more other amateur radio operators, to a radio operator who volunteers to deliver the radiogram content to its destination.

== VOA Radiogram ==
VOA Radiogram was an experimental Voice of America program, aired from 2012 to 2017, which broadcasts digital text and images via shortwave radiograms This digital stream can be decoded using a basic AM shortwave receiver and freely downloadable software of the Fldigi family. This software is available for Windows, Apple (macOS), Linux, and FreeBSD systems.

The mode used most often on VOA Radiogram, for both text and images, is MFSK32, but other modes are occasionally transmitted.

Broadcasts were made via the Edward R. Murrow transmitting station in North Carolina on the following schedule:

VOA Radiogram Broadcast Schedule
Day and Time (UTC)	Shortwave Frequency (kHz)
Saturday 0930 - 1000	7545
Saturday 1600 - 1630	17870
Sunday 0230 - 0300	5745
Sunday 1930 - 2000	15670

Due to the retirement of Dr. Kim Andrew Elliott from VOA and the decision of VOA to not replace his role with the program, VOA Radiogram program's final airing was on June 17–18, 2017, however Elliott will be continuing to air Radiograms via commercial shortwave stations under the name of "Shortwave Radiogram."
