= Z code =

Morse code operating signal of the US Army / NATO

Z Code (like Q Code and X Code) is a set of operating signals used in CW, TTY and RTTY radio communication.

== Distinct versions ==
There are at least three sets of Z codes.

1.	One set of codes was originally developed by Cable & Wireless Ltd. (the Cable & Wireless Service Z code) for commercial communications in the early days of wire and radio communications. Many of the old C&W codes are derived from mnemonics (ZAL = alter wavelength, ZAP = ack please, ZSF = send faster, etc.) The old C&W Z codes are not widely used today.
2.	APCO also developed a system of Z codes.
3.	NATO forces independently developed a later set of Z codes for military use and inter-language needs. The NATO Z codes are still in use, and are published in the unclassified document ACP-131.

There are other sets of codes internally used by Russia's military and other operating agencies.

== Examples ==
Some example Z codes
Code	Meaning	Source
ZAL (...) ...	I am closing down (until ...) due to ...	C&W
ZAP ...	Work ...: 1. Simplex; 2. Duplex; 3. Diplex; 4. Multiplex; 5. Single sideband; 6. With automatic error correction system; 7. Without automatic error correction system.; 8. With time and frequency diversity modem	C&W
ZBK	Are you receiving my traffic clear?	NATO
ZBK 1	I am receiving your traffic clear	NATO
ZBK 2	I am receiving your traffic garbled	NATO
ZBM 2	Place a competent operator on this circuit	C&W
ZBW ...	Change to backup frequency ...	C&W
ZBZ ...	Measure of printability 1=Garbled / unreadable, up to 5=Perfect	C&W
ZLD 2	I cannot transmit pictures	C&W
ZSF ... (...)	Switch off ... (except ...): 1. IFF; 2. IFF sets for 10 minutes in area denoted except for ships with the following call signs ...	C&W
ZUJ	Stand by.	NATO

== See also ==
- ACP-131
