= Brevity code =

Radio and telegraph signals encoding longer definitions

Brevity codes are used in amateur radio, maritime, aviation, police, and military communications. They are designed to convey complex information with a few words or codes. Some are classified from the public.

== List ==
- ACP-131 Allied military brevity codes
- ARRL Numbered Radiogram
- Commercial codes such as the Acme Commodity and Phrase Code, the ABC Telegraphic Code, Bentley's Complete Phrase Code, and Unicode
- Fox
- Multiservice tactical brevity code used by various military forces. The codes' procedure words, a type of voice procedure, are designed to convey complex information with a few words, when brevity is required but security is not
- Ten-code, North American police brevity codes, including such notable ones as 10-4
- Phillips Code
- NOTAM Code
- Q code, currently used mainly by amateur radio operators especially when using Morse code, originally designed for use by British ships and coastal stations
- Wire signal, Morse Code abbreviation, also known as 92 Code. Appears in informal language-independent ham conversations
- World War II Allied names for Japanese aircraft

== See also ==
- Operating signals
- SINPO code, code used to describe the quality of radio transmissions, especially in reception reports written by shortwave listeners
- R-S-T system, information about the quality of a radio signal being received. Used by amateur radio operators, shortwave listeners
- Morse code abbreviations
- Telegraphese
- List of HTTP status codes
- Tactical designator
