= Commercial code =

Commercial code might refer to:

- Commercial code (law), a set of laws designed to regulate commerce
- Commercial code (communications), a code used in telegraph and telex messages
