= Fox (code word) =

NATO munition release codeword

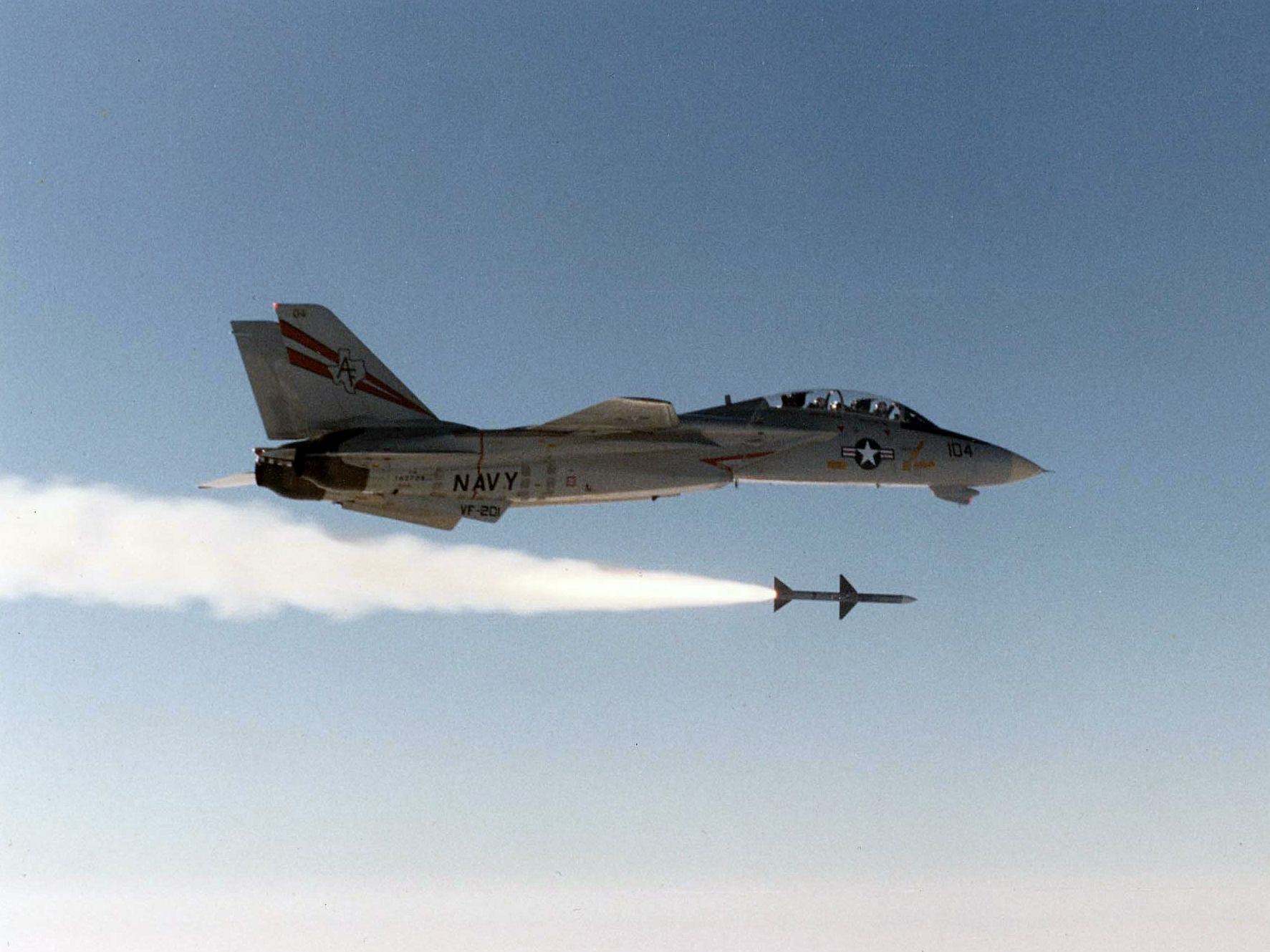
Grumman F-14 Tomcat firing an AIM-7 Sparrow | Fox One

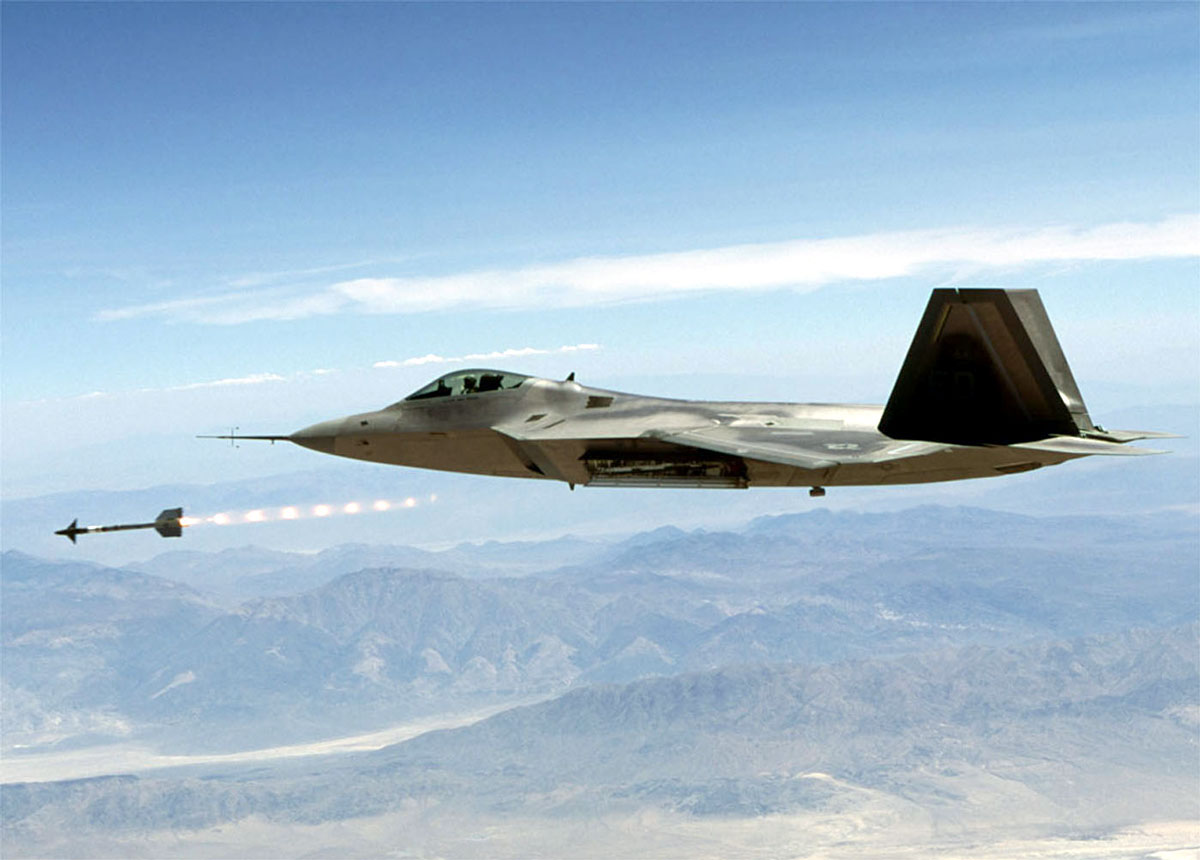
Lockheed Martin F-22 Raptor fires an AIM-9 Sidewinder | Fox Two

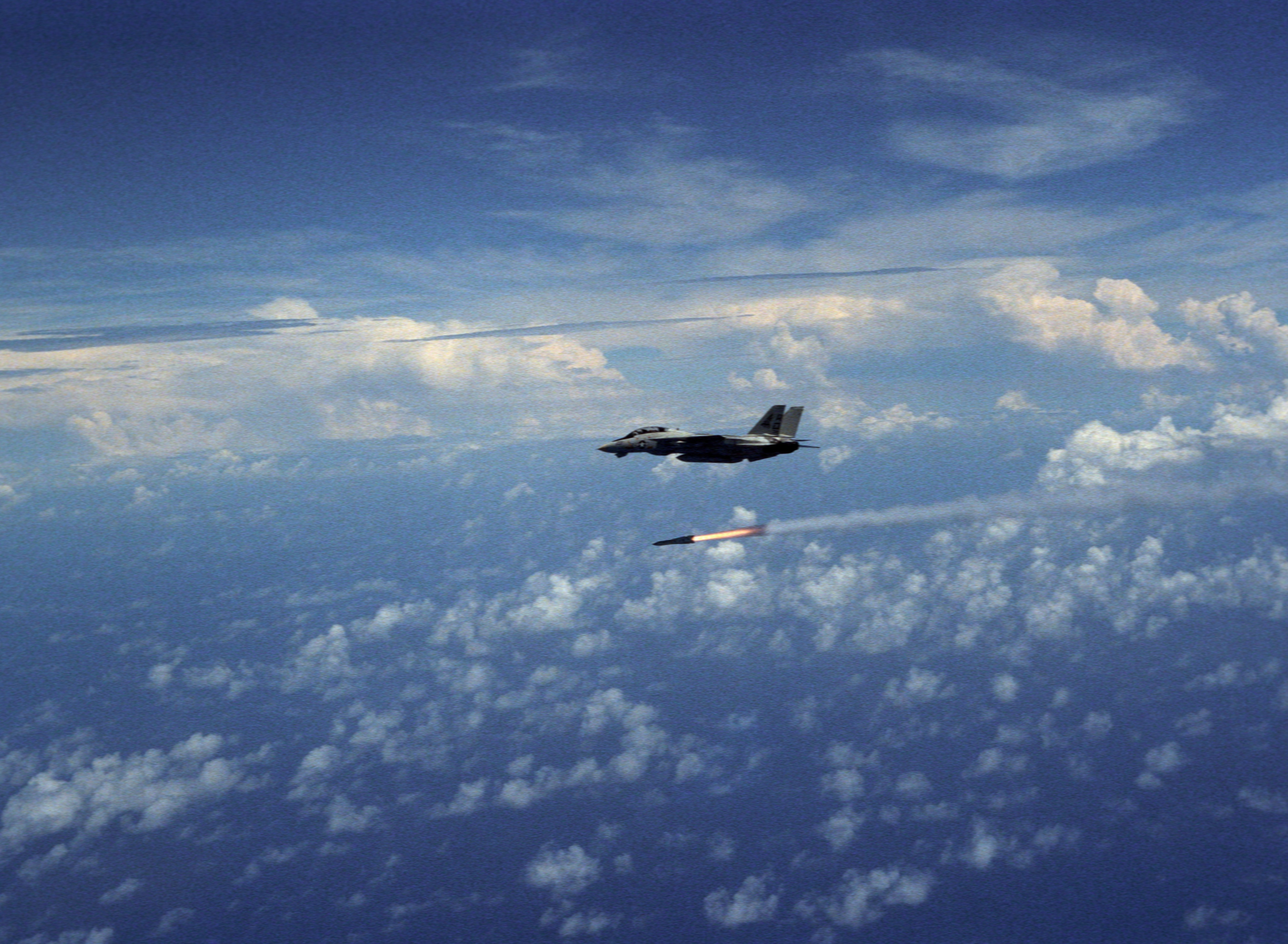
Grumman F-14 Tomcat fires an AIM-54 Phoenix Missile | Fox Three

Fox is a brevity code used by NATO pilots introduced in the late 1960s and early 1970s to signal the simulated or actual release of an air-to-air munition or other combat function. Army aviation elements may use a different nomenclature, as the nature of helicopter-fired weapons is almost always air-to-surface. "Fox" is short for "foxtrot", the NATO phonetic designation for the letter "F", which is short for "fire". A fighter pilot announcing that a weapon has been fired is intended to help avoid friendly fire, alerting other pilots to avoid maneuvering into the path of the munition.

There are three variations of the Fox brevity word in use, with a number added to the end of Fox to describe the primary type of sensors the launched munition possesses (if applicable). This includes autocannons and collisions.

Fox one
Indicates launch of a semi-active radar homing missile (such as the AIM-7 Sparrow).
Fox two
Indicates launch of an infrared homing missile (such as the AIM-9 Sidewinder).
Fox three
Indicates launch of an active radar homing missile (such as the AIM-120 AMRAAM or AIM-54 Phoenix (Terminal Phase Only)).

Prior to the advent of active radar homing missiles the code "Fox three" referred to the use of guns or cannon, such as the M61 Vulcan, which is used in various military aircraft. The difference can be noted in various war films, notably in the 1986 film Top Gun, where the term is used in various dogfight scenes.

"Fox four" was used to refer to the use of guns or cannon, but that was obsoleted in favor of the callout phrase "guns-guns-guns". The term still appears in fiction.

== See also ==
- Multiservice tactical brevity code
