= NOTAM code =

Brevity code for international aviation

NOTAM Code is an aeronautical radiotelegraph and radiotelephony brevity code used to transmit information about radio navigation aids, airports, lighting facilities, dangers to aircraft, and actions related to search and rescue. All NOTAM Codes start with the letter Q, to distinguish them from radio call signs, and always consist of five letters (counting the Q), to avoid confusing them with Q codes. These codes are defined by ICAO Doc 8400: ICAO Abbreviations and Codes.

== Second and third letters ==
Code	Signification	Uniform abbreviated phraseology
AGA	Lighting facilities (L)	
LA	Approach lighting system (specify runway and type)	als
LB	Aerodrome beacon	abn
LC	Runway centre line lights (specify runway)	rcll
LD	Landing direction indicator lights	ldi lgt
LE	Runway edge lights (specify runway)	redl
LF	Sequenced flashing lights (specify runway)	sequenced flg lgt
LG	Pilot-controlled lighting	pcl
LH	High intensity runway lights (specify runway)	high insts rwy lgt
LI	Runway end identifier lights (specify runway)	rwy end id lgt
LJ	Runway alignment indicator lights (specify runway)	rai lgt
LK	Category II components of approach lighting system (specify runway)	cat II components als
LL	Low intensity runway lights (specify runway)	low inst rwy lgt
LM	Medium intensity runway lights (specify runway)	medium inst rwy lgt
LP	Precision approach path indicator (specify runway)	papi
LR	All landing area lighting facilities	ldg area lgt fac
LS	Stopway lights (specify runway)	stwl
LT	Threshold lights (specify runway)	thr lgt
LU	Helicopter approach path indicator	hapi
LV	Visual approach slope indicator system (specify type and runway)	vasis
LW	Heliport lighting	heliport lgt
LX	Taxiway centre line lights (specify taxiway)	twy cl lgt
LY	Taxiway edge lights (specify taxiway)	twy edge lgt
LZ	Runway touchdown zone lights (specify runway)	rtzl

== See also ==
- Q code
- Brevity code
