= Telegram style =

Clipped language for writing telegrams

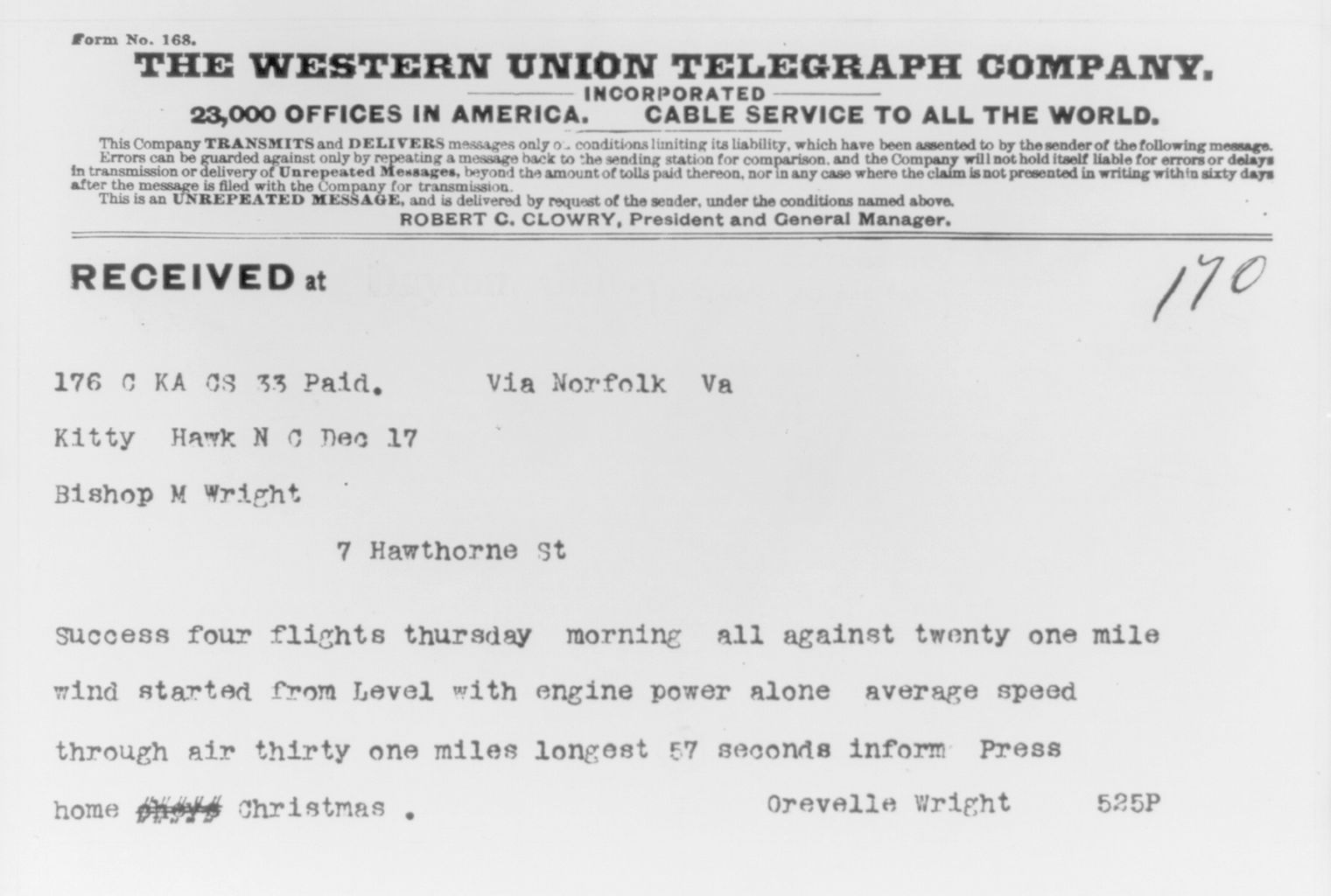
This telegram was sent by Orville Wright in December 1903 from Kitty Hawk, North Carolina, following the first successful airplane flight.

Telegram style, telegraph style, telegraphic style, or telegraphese is a clipped way of writing which abbreviates words and packs information into the smallest possible number of words or characters. It originated in the telegraph age when telecommunication consisted only of short messages transmitted by hand over the telegraph wire. The telegraph companies charged for their service by the number of words in a message, with a maximum of 15 characters per word for a plain-language telegram, and 10 per word for one written in code. The style developed to minimize costs but still convey the message clearly and unambiguously.

The related term cablese describes the style of press messages sent uncoded but in a highly condensed style over submarine communications cables. In the U.S. Foreign Service, cablese referred to condensed telegraphic messaging that made heavy use of abbreviations and avoided use of definite or indefinite articles, punctuation, and other words unnecessary for comprehension of the message.

== Antecedents ==
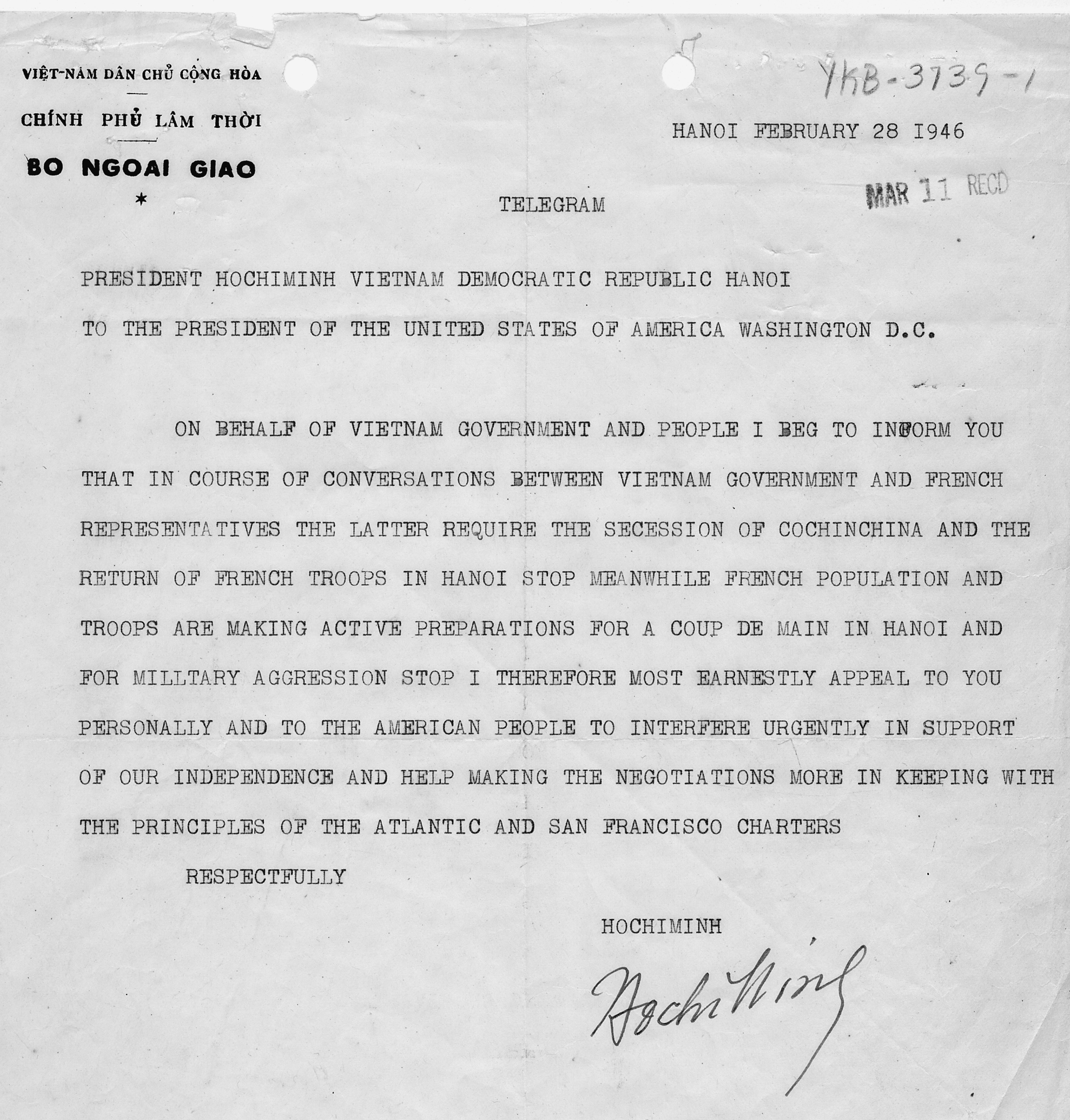
President Ho Chi Minh to President Truman, 1946.

Before the telegraph age military dispatches from overseas were made by letters transported by rapid sailing ships. Clarity and concision were often considered important in such correspondence.

An apocryphal story about the briefest correspondence in history has a writer (variously identified as Victor Hugo or Oscar Wilde) inquiring about the sales of his new book by sending the message "?" to his publisher, and receiving "!" in reply.

== Telegraphic coded expressions ==
Telegram of 21 June 1916 from David Lloyd George, Minister of Munitions, to Joseph Watson, Chairman of Barnbow Amatol shell-filling factory.

Through the history of telegraphy, very many dictionaries of telegraphese, codes or ciphers were developed, each serving to minimise the number of characters or words which needed to be transmitted in order to impart a message; the drivers for this economy were, for telegraph operators, the resource cost and limited bandwidth of the system; and for the consumer, the cost of sending messages.

Examples of telegraphic code-words and their equivalent expressions, taken from The Adams Cable Codex (1894) are:

Emolument	Think you had better not wait.
Emotion	Think you had better wait until ...
Emotional	Think you had better wait and sail ...
Empaled	Think well of party mentioned.
Empanel	This is a matter of great importance.

Note that in the Adams code, the code-words are all actual English words; some telegraph companies charged more for coded messages, or had shorter word-size limits (10-character maximum vs. 15 characters). Compare these to the following examples from the A.B.C. Universal Commercial Electric Telegraphic Code (1901) all of which are English-like, but invented words:

Nalezing	Do only what is absolutely necessary.
Nalime	Will only do what is absolutely necessary.
Nallary	It is not absolutely necessary, but it would be an advantage.
Naloopen	It is not absolutely necessary, but well worth the outlay.

== Comparison to modern text messaging ==
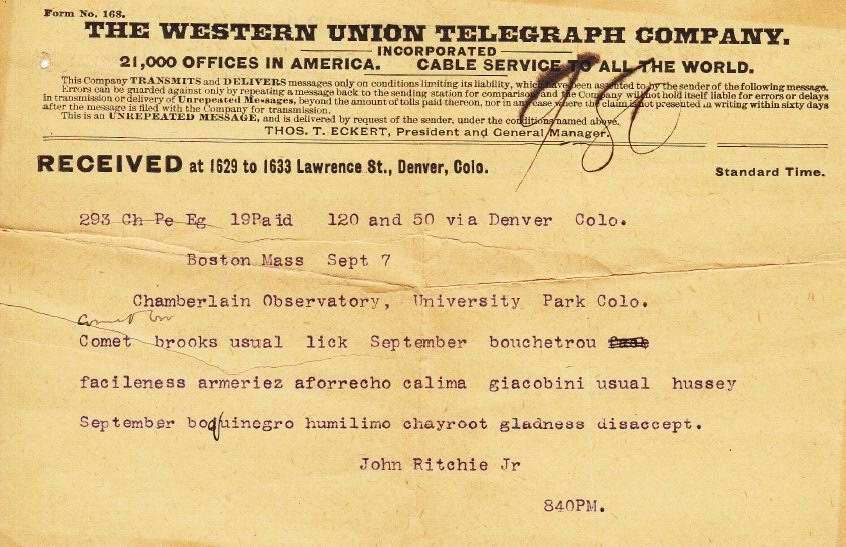
A telegram from 7 September 1896 to report positions of two comets was encoded for data integrity.

In some ways, telegram style was the precursor to the abbreviated language used in text messaging or short message standard (SMS) services such as Twitter, referred to as SMS language

For telegrams, space was at a premium—economically speaking—and abbreviations were used as necessity. This motivation was revived for compressing information into the 160-character limit of a costly SMS before the advent of multi-message capabilities. Length constraints, and the initial handicap of having to enter each individual letter using multiple keypresses on a numeric pad, drove re-adoption of telegraphic style. Continued space limits and high per-message cost meant the practice persisted for some time after the introduction of built-in predictive text assistance. Some who favor predictive entry claim that telegraphing persists, despite it then needing more effort to write (and read); however, many others assert that predictive text generation is usually wrong, and hence find it more tedious and vexing to erase-and-correct predicted text than to turn off auto-text generation and directly enter their messages "telegraph style".

== Other languages ==
In Japanese, telegrams are printed using the katakana script, one of the few instances in which this script is used for entire sentences. This is a rare context in which someone might see the particle katakana ヲ instead of the equivalent hiragana を; these are virtually never used in words, so they are not in the parts of speech that get substituted into katakana.

== Telegram length ==
The average length of a telegram in the 1900s in the US was 11.93 words; more than half of the messages were 10 words or fewer.

According to another study, the mean length of the telegrams sent in the UK before 1950 was 14.6 words or 78.8 characters.

For German telegrams, the mean length is 11.5 words or 72.4 characters. At the end of the 19th century the average length of a German telegram was calculated as 14.2 words.

== See also ==
- Headlinese, a similar shorthand in newspaper headlines
- SMS language, abbreviated styles used in instant messaging and texting
