= Acme Commodity and Phrase Code =

Codebook published in 1923

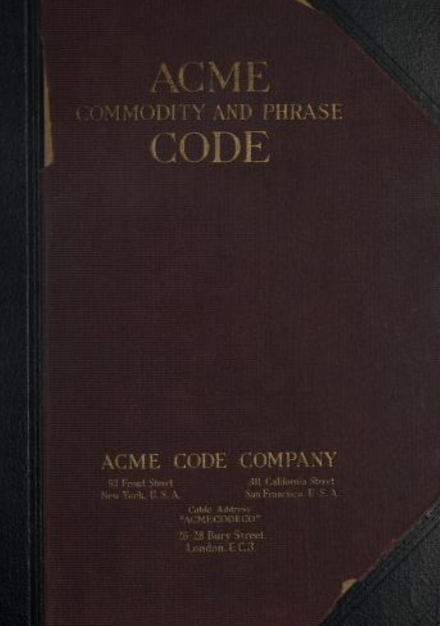
- Author: A. C. Meisenbach
- Subject: Cipher and telegraph codes
- Publication date: 1923
- Publication place: United States
- Pages: 902
- OCLC: 1050563
- LC Class: HE7676 .A2

Acme Commodity and Phrase Code is a codebook providing the general-purpose commercial telegraph code known as the Acme Code. It was published in 1923 by the Acme Code Company. The book provides a listing of condensed terms and codes used to shorten telegrams and save money. The book was extremely popular amongst businesses in the 1930s. This code was one of the few telegram codes permitted by the Allied powers during the Second World War.

== Description ==
The Acme code consists of one hundred thousand five letter codes each intended to stand in for a phrase. It was designed to be tolerant of transposition errors; the author claims that "no transposition of any two adjoining letters will make another word in the book". However, as later discovered by J. Reeds, the code did not provide this level of error correction, containing at least eleven pairs of words differing only by the transposition of two letters. Despite these errors, this code is a precursor to more modern error correction codes.
