= Commercial code (communications) =

List of codes and abbreviations used to save on cablegram costs

In telecommunication, a commercial code is a code once used to save on cablegram costs. Telegraph (and telex) charged per word sent, so companies which sent large volumes of telegrams developed codes to save money on tolls. Elaborate commercial codes which encoded complete phrases into single words were developed and published as codebooks of thousands of phrases and sentences with corresponding codewords. Commercial codes were not generally intended to keep telegrams private, as codes were widely published; they were usually cost-saving measures only. This act of encoding large amounts of information into smaller amounts of information is a form of data compression.

Many general-purpose codes, such as the Acme Code and the ABC Code, were published and widely used between the 1870s and the 1950s, before the arrival of transatlantic telephone calls and next-day airmail rendered them obsolete. Numerous special-purpose codes were also developed and sold for fields as varied as aviation, car dealerships, insurance, and cinema, containing words and phrases commonly used in those professions.

These codes turned complete phrases into single words (commonly of five letters). These were not always genuine words; for example, codes contained "words" such as BYOXO ("Are you trying to weasel out of our deal?"), LIOUY ("Why do you not answer my question?"), BMULD ("You're a skunk!"), or AYYLU ("Not clearly coded, repeat more clearly.").

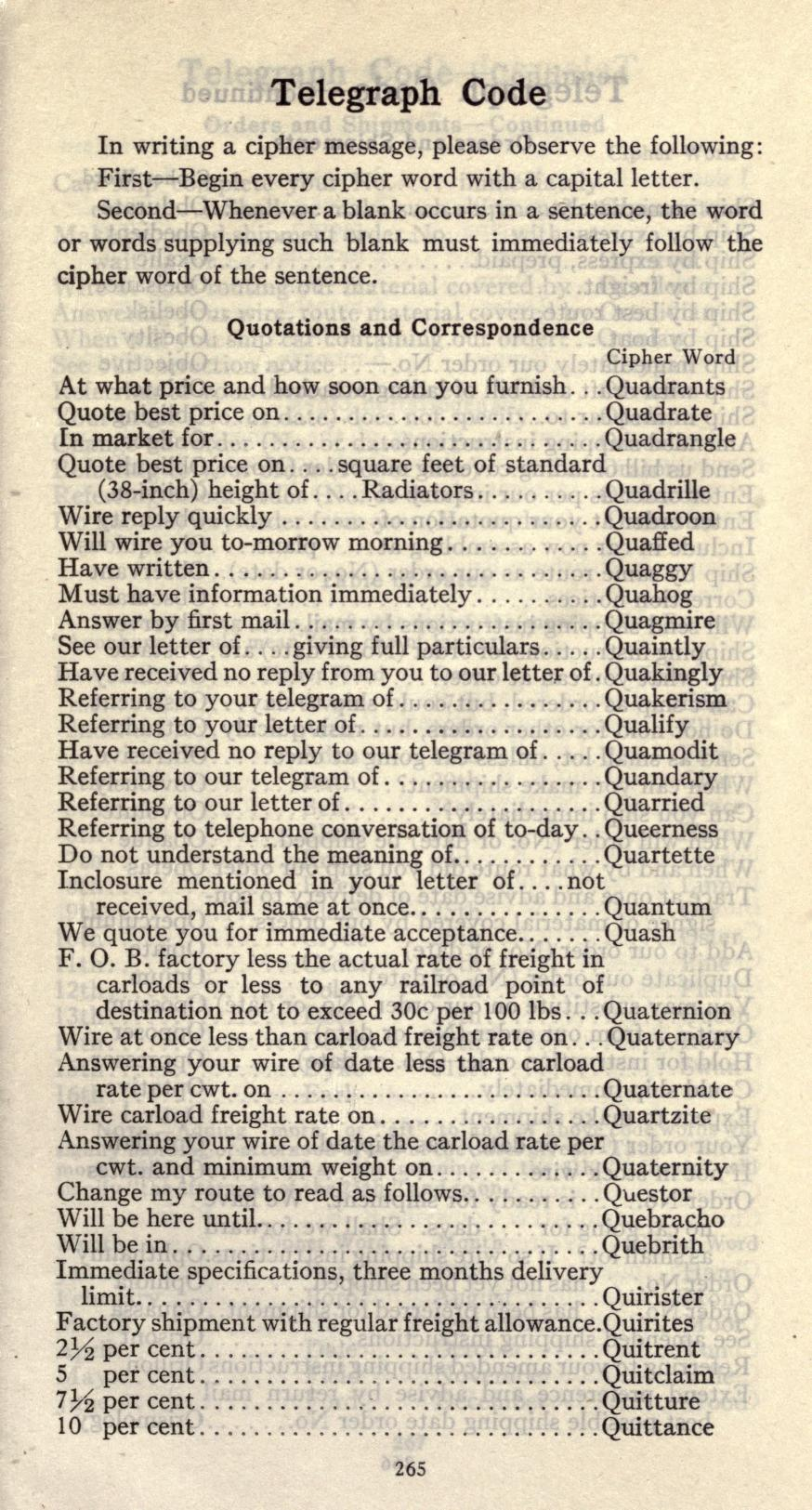
First of 20 pages of commercial telegraph code from a 1910 radiator catalog

== History ==
The first telegraphic codes were developed shortly after the advent of the telegraph, and spread rapidly: the first codebook was in use by 1845. In 1854, one eighth of telegrams transmitted between New York and New Orleans were written in code. Cable tolls were charged by the word, and telegraph companies counted codewords like any other words, so a carefully constructed code could reduce message lengths enormously.

Early codes were typically compilations of phrases and corresponding codewords numbering in the tens of thousands. Codewords were chosen to be pronounceable words to minimize errors by telegraphers, and telegrams composed of non-pronounceable words cost significantly more. Regulations of the International Telegraph Union evolved over time; in 1879, it mandated coded telegrams only contain words from German, English, Spanish, French, Italian, Dutch, Portuguese, or Latin, but commercial codes already frequently used nonsense words. By 1903 regulations were changed to allow any pronounceable word no more than ten letters long.

Another aim of the telegraph codes was to reduce the risk of misunderstanding by avoiding having similar words mean similar things. Codes were usually designed to avoid error by using words which could not be easily confused by telegraph operators. Telegrapher errors could sometimes cause serious monetary damages, which in one instance resulted in the United States Supreme Court case Primrose v. Western Union Telephone Company, in which a wool dealer argued that an error by a Western Union telegrapher cost $20,000 due to misread instructions. The Supreme Court subsequently ruled Western Union was liable only for the cost of the message, $1.15.

Examples of commercial codes include the ABC Telegraphic Code, Bentley's Second Phrase Code, Lieber's Standard Telegraphic Code (1896), Phillips Code (1879 and later), Slater's Telegraphy Code (1916), Western Union Universal Codebook (1907) and Unicode (1889).

== Mechanics ==
In codes such as the ABC Code, code words could contain blanks. For example, in the "Freight and tonnage requirements" section, ANTITACTE means "Mozambique, loading at not more than two places, to ____, steamer for about ____ tons general cargo at ____ per ton on the d/w capacity to cargo". The telegrapher would then fill in the three parameters: the destination, the number of tons, and the price per ton.

The regulations of the International Telegraph Convention distinguished between "code telegrams", which it describes as "those composed of words the context of which has no intelligible meaning", and "cipher telegrams", which it describes as "those containing series of groups of figures or letters having a secret meaning or words not to be found in a standard dictionary of the language". Cipher telegrams were subject to higher tolls.

Codes such as the ABC Telegraphic Code, therefore, included both numbers and code words so the user could choose between the two.

== Examples ==
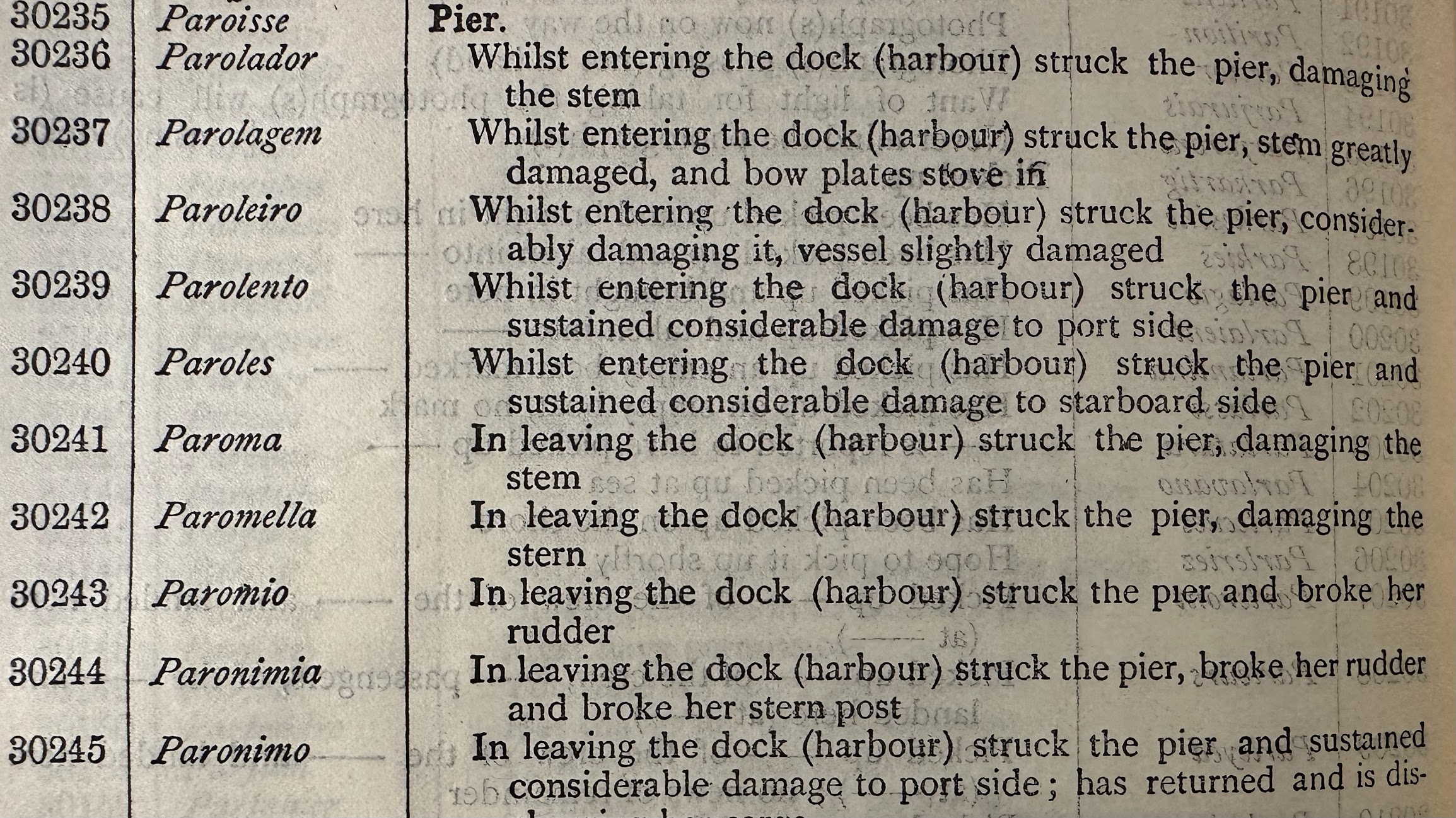
"Piers" section of the Fifth Edition ABC Telegraphic Code with encoded word PAROMELLA

Example code words:

- From the ABC Telegraphic Code (5th edition):
  - PAROMELLA — in leaving the dock (harbour) struck the pier, damaging the stern
  - ARIMASPEN — Phaeton with 6 B.H.P. two cylinder motor to seat four passengers speed — miles per hour
  - HAUBARER — Charterers will allow the option of carrying horses for ship's benefit
- From the ABC Telegraphic Code (6th edition):
  - ENBET — Captain is insane
- From Bentley's Complete Phrase Code:
  - OYFIN — has not been reinsured
  - AZKHE — clean bill of health
  - ATGAM — have they authorised?
- From the telegraphic cipher code specially adapted to the cotton trade:
  - DRESS — the supply from India will be less than expected
  - INSANE — at what price, free on board and freight, can you offer us cotton for shipment by steamer sailing this week?
  - PUNCHER — we anticipate rate of interest will be reduced by Bank of England
- From Unicode (which, unlike the others, was intended for domestic use in addition to commercial; unrelated to the Unicode computing standard):
  - DIONYSIA — Amputation is considered necessary
  - ANNOSUS — Confined yesterday, Twins, both dead, Mother not expected to live
  - COGNOSCO — Dining out this evening, send my dress clothes here
- From Lieber's Standard Telegraphic Code (1896):
  - AANPRATEN — Have accomplished nothing.
  - ALBANAMOS — Decline caused by Brazilians selling in this market.
  - BOATTIERE — Hear there has been a robbery; is it true?

== See also ==
- Codebook
- Brevity code
- Australian railway telegraphic codes
- Great Western Railway telegraphic codes
- Telegraph code
- Telegraphese
