= Multi-service tactical brevity code =

Brevity code for NATO communications

April 2025 edition of the Multi-Service Brevity Codes

Multi-Service Tactical Brevity Codes are standardized procedure words used by multiple branches of the military to efficiently communicate complex information through concise, easily understood terms. These codes are a specialized form of voice procedure intended to improve clarity, speed, and coordination in tactical operations.

== American/NATO codes ==
The following list outlines standardized American brevity codes employed during joint service operations. This collection excludes terms unique to individual branches. While these codes are not officially binding across services, they are widely recognized and their meanings agreed upon. Their use enhances interoperability and situational awareness among air, ground, sea, and space forces operating at the tactical level.

The provided key indicates which communities use specific terms, as some codes may carry different meanings depending on the service or mission context. These distinctions are noted in-line with each brevity code entry.

Key
Denotation	Meaning
No Caveat	Denotes a general brevity code.
*	Meaning may differ from the North Atlantic Treaty Organization (NATO) brevity word.
**	Not a NATO brevity word.
[A/A]	Applies to air-to-air (A/A) operations or communications.
[AIR-MAR]	Applies to maritime air (AIR-MAR) operations or communications.
[A/S]	Applies to air-to-surface (A/S) operations or communications.
[EW]	Applies to electromagnetic warfare (EW) operations or communications.
[MAR]	Applies to maritime-to-maritime (MAR) operations or communications.
[S/A]	Applies to surface-to-air (S/A) operations or communications.
[SO]	Applies to space operations (SO) operations or communications.
[S/S]	Applies to surface-to-surface (S/S) operations or communications.

== A ==
ABORT
Cease action or terminate the attack prior to weapons release or event or mission.
[High or Low] ACCURACY
Prebriefed criteria is met during geolocation; must be briefed by package commander (or outlined in the special instructions (SPINS)/standards).^{**}
ACTION
Initiate a briefed attack sequence or maneuver.^{[A/A] [A/S] [S/A] [AIR-MAR]}
[system] ACTIVE [location, direction]
Referenced emitter is radiating at the stated location or along the stated bearing. Electronic intelligence derived.^{* [A/A] [EW]}
ADD [system or category]
Add a specific (system) or (electromagnetic order of battle (EOB) category) to search responsibilities.^{** [EW]}
[weapon] AFFIRM
FRIENDLY surface-to-air weapons platform are prepared to engage specified target(s) (e.g., BIRD(S) AFFIRM). Opposite of NEGATE.^{* [S/A]}
ALARM
Terminate or terminating emissions control procedures. Opposite of SNOOZE.^{[A/A] [EW] [MAR] [SO]}
ALLIGATOR
Link-11A or tactical data link Alpha.
ALPHA CHECK
Request for confirmation of bearing and range from aircraft to described point.^{*}
ANCHOR [location]
1. Orbit about a specific point.
2. Refueling track flown by tanker.
ANCHORED [location]
Turning engagement at the specified location.^{* [A/A]}
ANGELS
Height of FRIENDLY aircraft in thousands of feet from mean sea level (MSL).
ANYFACE
FRIENDLY command and control (C2) agency when call sign is not known.
ARIZONA
No antiradiation missile ordnance remaining.^{[A/S] [EW]}
[direction] ARM
CONTACT(S) within a single GROUP that maneuvers outside of the GROUP criteria.^{[A/A] [AIR-MAR]}
AS FRAGGED
Unit or element will be performing exactly as briefed or scheduled.^{*}
ASLEEP
No longer detecting land or surface emitter activity via communications intelligence. Opposite of AWAKE.^{** [EW]}
ATTACK
An informative call indicating aircraft are committed to air-to-surface delivery on a specific ground target. Note: Not to be used in a close air support (CAS) engagement.^{* [A/S]}
AUTHENTICATE
To request or provide a response for a coded challenge.
AUTOCAT
Any communications relay using automatic retransmissions.
AVALANCHE
Informative call indicating friendly forces require reinforcement in a specific location.^{** [A/A] [AIR-MAR]}
AWAKE
Land or surface emitter activity detected via communications intelligence. Opposite of ASLEEP.^{** [EW]}
[number, weapon type] AWAY
Release or launch of specified weapon (e.g., 1 AWAY, 2 PIGS AWAY, BIRDS AWAY, etc.). At minimum, number or weapon type required. Note: Include launch location in BULLSEYE format and weapons track direction when appropriate.^{[A/S] [AIR-MAR] [S/A]}
AZIMUTH
1. A picture label describing two GROUPS separated laterally. GROUP names will be referenced by cardinal directions (e.g., NORTH GROUP, SOUTH GROUP, or EAST GROUP, WEST GROUP).^{[A/A] [AIR-MAR]}
2. Direction to the threat.^{** [A/A] [S/A]}

== B ==
BAD MAP
Call that the displayed map is unusable due to the following: Terrain - call that shadows obstruct the target area and a map must be taken from a different axis or graze angle. Image - call that the displayed image quality prevents target identification (ID).^{** [A/S]}
BANDIT
1. Positively identified as an enemy in accordance with (IAW) theater ID criteria. The term does not imply direction or authority to engage.^{[A/A] [AIR-MAR]}
2. A SUSPECT whose orbital parameters are such that it may become a collection and/or counterspace concern to a spacecraft in the relative near-term, therefore limiting decision space.^{* [SO]}
BANZAI
Execute(ing) launch and decide tactics with the intent to maneuver into the visual arena.^{* [A/A]}
BASE [+/- number]
Reference number used to indicate such information as headings, altitude, fuels, etc.
BAT(S)
FRIENDLY net-enabled glide weapon(s) with a multi-mode seeker (e.g., standoff weapon, guided bomb unit, small diameter bomb).^{** [A/S]}
BAY
Carry out deception plan indicated or IAW previous orders.^{[EW]}
BEAD WINDOW
Last transmission potentially disclosed unauthorized information.^{*}
BEAM [direction]
CONTACT stabilized within 60-109 degrees angle of trail or 71-120 degrees angle from nose.^{[A/A]}
BEAM RIDER [direction]
Potential JAMMER along the stated azimuth from a ground unit or aircraft stated from the unit or aircraft's location. Usually followed by a request to search using an alternate radar source.^{** [A/A] [A/S]}
[system] BENT
System indicated is inoperative. Cancelled by SWEET.^{*}
BERETTA
Aircraft is out of or unable to employ remaining air-to-ground ordnance, not to include gun (if equipped).^{** [A/S]}
BIG STICK
FRIENDLY long-range surface-to-air missile(s) (SAM(s)). Modifiers include: AWAY, NEGATE, AFFIRM.^{** [S/A]}
BINGO
Prebriefed fuel state needed for recovery.^{*}
BIRD(S)
FRIENDLY SAM(s). Modifiers include: AWAY, NEGATE, AFFIRM.^{[S/A]}
BIRDDOG
Call to configure sensors IAW mission planning/brief.^{**}
BITTERSWEET
Notification of potential for blue-on-blue (friendly fire) or blue-on-neutral situation.^{**}
BLACKOUT
1. Turn off all external lighting.^{** [A/A]}
2. Surface ship radar is unable to effectively search or transition tracking to a new object due to over saturation.^{** [MAR]}
BLANK
Signal is on the air with zero content.^{** [SO]}
BLIND
No visual contact with FRIENDLY aircraft, ship, or ground position. Opposite of VISUAL.
BLOCK
An inherently defensive tactic used to force a vessel to alter course away from the defended asset or stop its closure. It is accomplished by maneuvering a unit directly in front of the closing vessel and maintaining position. The possibility of collision exists, depending on the intent of the closing vessel.^{** [MAR]}
BLOTTER
Electromagnetic countermeasure receiver.^{[EW]}
BLOW(ING) THROUGH
1. Continue straight ahead at the MERGE and do not become ANCHORED with target(s).^{[A/A]}
2. Intercepting aircraft is dropping targeting responsibility and commencing a BLOW THROUGH.^{** [A/A]}
BLUR
Radar being jammed.^{**}
BOGEY
A CONTACT whose identity is unknown.^{[A/A] [S/A] [SO]}
BOGEY DOPE
Request for information on indicated or closest GROUP in bearing, range, altitude, and aspect (BRAA) format (with appropriate fill-ins).^{* [A/A] [S/A]}
BOOSTER
Track identified as a separated booster phase component of a ballistic missile.^{** [S/A]}
BOX
Picture label with GROUPS in a square or offset square.^{[A/A] [AIR-MAR]}
BRAA
1. Provides target BRAA relative to the specified FRIENDLY aircraft (tactical control format).^{[A/A] [S/A]}
2. Switch to BRAA format to a specific GROUP or CONTACT.
BRACKET [direction]
Maneuver to a position on opposite sides, either laterally or vertically from the target.^{[A/A] [A/S]}
BREAK [direction]
Perform an immediate maximum performance turn in the indicated direction (default is a 180-degree turn).^{[A/A]}
BREAK AWAY
Tanker or receiver call indicating immediate vertical and nose-to-tail separation between tanker and receiver is required.
BROKEN SPUR
Helicopter buddy or self-extraction is not possible.^{** [A/S]}
BROWNING
SAM platform has reached low missile state.^{** [S/A]}
BRUISER
Employment of FRIENDLY air-launched, short range (e.g., <100 nautical miles [NM]), subsonic anti-ship weapon(s). Option to add follow-on modifiers for number of munitions and/or time of flight. Note: Include launch location in BULLSEYE format and weapons track direction when appropriate.^{* [AIR-MAR] [A/S]}
BUCKET
C2 is experiencing radar electromagnetic deceptive jamming in a specified geographic area.^{** [EW]}
BUDDY [LASE or GUIDE]
Request or informative communication to have weapon guidance from a source other than delivering aircraft.^{* [A/S]}
BUDDY LOCK [position, heading, altitude]
Radar locked to a known FRIENDLY aircraft. Normally, a response to a SPIKED or BUDDY SPIKE calls.^{[A/A]}
BUDDY SPIKE [position or heading or altitude]
FRIENDLY system radar lock-on indication on radar warning receiver.^{[A/A]}
BUGOUT [direction]
Separation from a particular engagement, attack, or operation with no intent to reengage or return.^{[A/A] [A/S] [AIR-MAR]}
BULLDOG
FRIENDLY surface- or submarine- launched antiship missile.^{* [MAR] [S/S]}
BULLRING
Maritime aircraft patrol zone.^{[AIR-MAR]}
BULLSEYE
An established reference point from which the position of an object can be referenced by bearing (magnetic) and range (nautical miles) from this point.
BUMP
Change power, plus or minus, from current power.^{* [SO]}
BUSTER
Fly at maximum continuous speed.
BUTTON
Radio channel setting.
BUZZER
Electromagnetic communications jamming. Note: Same as North Atlantic Treaty Organization (NATO) term, CHATTER^{** [EW]}
BUZZSAW
A chemical light-stick tied to a string and swung overhead; used to mark a FRIENDLY position.^{** [A/S]}

== C ==
CANDYGRAM
Informative call that EW targeting information is available on a briefed secure net.^{[EW]}
CANYON
Use electromagnetic jamming on radar frequency indicated or IAW previous orders or informative call for execution of electromagnetic attack (EA) list or EA against designated group.^{[EW]}
CAP(PING) [location]
1. Establish a combat air patrol at a specified point, used prior to committing forces in support of a defensive operation.^{[A/A]}
2. Aircraft is established in an orbit.^{[A/A]}
[target or object] CAPTURED
Object has been acquired and is being tracked.^{* [A/S]}
CATALOG
A directive call to record a potential target's description, location, and elevation information on a potential target.^{** [A/A] [A/S] [AIR-MAR]}
CEASE [activity]
Discontinue stated activity (e.g., CEASE BUZZER, LASER, SPARKLE, TORCH).^{*}
CEASE ENGAGEMENT
A fire control order used to direct air defense units to stop tactical action against a specified target. Break the engagement on the target specified and prepare to engage another target. Missiles in flight will continue to intercept.^{* [A/A]}
CEASE FIRE
Stop firing, do not open fire. Missiles in flight will continue to intercept; continue to track.
CHAMELEON
An EW target identified as operating on a known frequency with changes to external parameters. The term does not imply direction or authority to engage.^{** [EW] [SO]}
CHAMPAGNE
A picture label of three distinct GROUPS with two in front and one behind. GROUP names should be NORTH LEAD GROUP and SOUTH LEAD GROUP or WEST LEAD GROUP and EAST LEAD GROUP and TRAIL GROUP.^{[A/A] [AIR-MAR]}
CHARLIE
A signal to land aboard the ship. A number suffix indicates a time delay in minutes before the landing is anticipated (e.g., CHARLIE ten).^{[AIR-MAR]}
CHATTERMARK [comm type]
Begin using briefed communication procedures to counter communications jamming. If no modifier specified, "radio" is understood.
CHEAPSHOT
Active missile data link terminated prior to achieving an active state.^{* [A/A]}
CHECK [number, left or right]
Turn (number) degrees left or right and maintain new heading.^{* [A/A]}
CHECK CAPTURE
Target appears to be no longer tracked by sensor.^{[A/S]}
CHECK DATA [source]
Reference specified medium for message traffic (e.g., Internet relay chat, J28.2 [Link-16 free text message]).
CHECK FIRE(ING)
Immediate pause of direct or indirect fires. May require coordination to continue.^{** [A/S] [MAR] [S/S]}
CHECK FOCUS
Sensor image appears to be out of focus.
CHECKPRINT [track number]
1. Request from the air defense commander for unit(s) to provide amplifying information on a specified track.^{[AIR-MAR]}
2. Reply to the air defense commander followed by positive track information using format specified in applicable operation task document.^{[AIR-MAR]}
CHECK SOLUTION
Order sent by the spotter for the ship to check the fire control solution when an excessive initial or salvo-to-salvo error is observed.^{** [MAR] [S/S]}
CHECK TIDS
Directive or descriptive call to reference data link display and may be followed by amplifying information.^{**}
CHERRY
Call to inbound aircraft the landing zone (LZ), helicopter landing zone, or drop zone (DZ) has enemy activity above the prebriefed risk tolerance. Opposite of and cancels ICE.^{** [A/A] [A/S] [S/A]}
CHERUBS
Height of a FRIENDLY aircraft in hundreds of feet above ground level.
CHICK(S)
Term used to denote FRIENDLY aircraft on the safe flight or mission.^{*}
CHRISTMAS TREE
Turn on all external lighting.^{** [A/A]}
CLAM
1. Cease emissions on specified equipment.^{[EW]}
2. Directive or informative call that jamming has stopped on current assignment. Assumed when COLD.^{* [EW]}
CLEAN
1. No sensor information on a GROUP of interest.^{[A/A]}
2. No visible battle damage.
3. Aircraft not carrying external stores.
CLEARED
Requested action is authorized. Note: Engaged support roles not established or transferred.^{[A/A]}
CLEARED HOT
Term used by a joint terminal attack controller (JTAC) / forward air controller (airborne) (FAC(A)) during Type 1 and 2 CAS terminal attack control when granting weapons release clearance to an aircraft attacking a specific target.^{[A/S]}
CLEARED TO ENGAGE
1. Term used by a JTAC/FAC(A) during Type 3 control, granting a weapons release clearance to an aircraft or flight to attack a target or targets within the parameters prescribed by the JTAC/FAC(A).^{** [A/S]}
2. Clearance to fire on designated GROUP or target.^{** [A/A] [A/S]}
CLIFF
Jamming signal.^{* [EW]}
CLOAK(ING)
Switch(ing) from normal or overt external lighting to covert night-vision device only compatible lighting.^{**}
CLOSING
Decreasing separation.^{[A/A]}
CLOVER [left or right]
Rotary-wing directive call to establish clover patterns in stated direction (e.g., "Taz 3-1, CLOVER left").^{** [A/S]}
CLUSTER
Multiple ballistic missile objects within a small volume of space.^{** [S/A]}
COLD
1. Initiate(ing) a turn in the combat air patrol away from the anticipated threats.^{[A/A]}
2. Defined area is not expected to receive fire (enemy or FRIENDLY).^{* [A/S]}
3. Intercept geometry will result in a pass or roll out behind the target.^{[A/A]}
4. Contact aspect stabilized 0-20 degrees from the tail or 160-180 degrees from the nose (or from the stern or bow for a ship respectively).^{* [A/A] [AIR-MAR]}
5. Contact aspect stabilized 0-20 degrees or 160-180 degrees from referenced position (e.g., friendly forward operating base, named area of interest, target area).^{* [A/S]}
COLOR [system, position]
Request for information on a type (system) at stated location; implies a request for ambiguity resolution. May be used with data link data message (e.g., color, data).^{[EW]}
COMEBACK [direction]
Directive call to reverse course.
COME OFF [direction]
1. Maneuver as indicated to either regain mutual support or to deconflict flight paths. Implies both VISUAL and TALLY.^{[A/A]}
2. Maneuver or execute a specific instruction.^{[A/S]}
COMMIT
1. Intercept the GROUP(S) of interest.^{* [A/A]}
2. Set briefed intercept geometry.^{* [A/A]}
CONFIDENCE [level]
Confidence indication IAW operational directives.^{*}
CONS/CONNING
Aircraft producing contrails.^{* [A/A]}
CONTACT(S)
1. Sensor information at the stated position.
2. Acknowledges sighting of a specified reference point (either visually or via sensor).^{[A/S]}
3. Individual radar return within a GROUP or ARM.^{[A/A]}
CONTAINER
Inner GROUP formation with four CONTACTs oriented in a square or offset square.^{[A/A] [AIR-MAR]}
CONTINUE
Continue present maneuver, does not imply a change in clearance to engage or expend ordnance.
CONTINUE DRY
Continue present maneuver, ordnance release not authorized. Used to provide approval to aircraft to continue the pass without expending ordnance during Type 1, 2, or 3 control. (JTAC must use "Type 3, CONTINUE DRY" for dry Type 3 control). Note: Simulated weapons deliveries may be performed.^{[A/S]}
COVER
1. Assign surface-to-air weapons or establish an air-to-air posture that will allow engagement of a specified track or threat if required.^{[A/A] [S/A]}
2. Directive call to be ready for reattack/re-engage if weapons effects not achieved.^{[A/S] [AIR-MAR]}
3. Assign weapons or establish posture that allows engagement of a specified track or threat.^{[SO]}
COVEY
Two or more QUAIL.^{** [A/S] [S/S]}
CRANK [direction]
Maneuver in the direction indicated. Implies illuminating target at or near radar GIMBAL limits.^{[A/A]}
CRATER [location]
Expected threat ballistic missile impact point.^{** [S/A] [S/S]}
CREEP
Characterize signal.^{** [SO] [EW]}
CRISS CROSS
A position or track derived from the plotting of direction finding bearings.^{[EW]}
CROSSING
Two GROUPs initially separated in azimuth decreasing azimuth separation to pass each other.^{[A/A]}
CROW(S)
Detainees or prisoners.^{**}
CRUISE
Return to cruise speed (after BUSTER or GATE).
CURVE
Deception signal.^{[EW]}
CUTOFF [direction]
Request for, or directive to, intercept using cutoff geometry.^{[A/A]}

== D ==
DAISY
Notification that signal characteristics are within validated parameters.^{** [SO] [EW]}
DARK STAR
An illumination round that fails to properly ignite.^{** [S/S]}
DASH [number]
Aircraft position within a flight. Use if specific call sign is unknown.
DATA [object, position]
Data link message concerning object at stated location.
[weapon] DAZZLE (ON/OFF)
Suppressive nonlethal fire on a target to degrade sensor performance below the level needed to fulfill its mission objectives.^{**}
DEADEYE
Laser designator system inoperative.
DECLARE
Inquiry as to the ID of specified track(s), target(s), or correlated GROUP. Responses may include: FRIENDLY, BOGEY, BANDIT, HOSTILE, NEUTRAL, UNABLE, CLEAN, or FURBALL. Full positional data (BULLSEYE) or TRACK NUMBER must accompany responses.^{* [A/A] [S/A] [AIR-MAR]}
DECLUTTER
1. Request for the pilot or operator to remove targeting symbology to allow the user to see a better picture of the target area.^{[A/S]}
2. Minimize on-screen graphics to prevent an object of interest from being obscured.^{* [A/A]}
DEEP
Indicates separation between the nearest and farthest GROUPS in range in a relative formation of three or more GROUPS, used to describe a LADDER, VIC, CHAMPAGNE, or BOX.^{[A/A] [AIR-MAR]}
DEFENDING [direction]
Aircraft is in a defensive position and maneuvering with reference to a radar threat.^{[A/A] [A/S]}
DEFENSIVE
Aircraft is under attack, maneuvering defensively, and unable to ensure deconfliction or mutual support.^{[A/A]}
DELOUSE
Detect, identify, and engage (if required) unknown platform trailing FRIENDLY platform.^{[A/A] [S/A] [SO]}
DELTA [altitude] [position]
Hold and conserve fuel at altitude and position indicated during shipboard operations.^{[AIR-MAR]}
DEPLOY
Maneuver to briefed positioning.^{[A/A] [A/S] [SO]}
DETAILS
Request for attack or execution brief.
DIAMONDS [position]
A surface infrared (IR) event location.
DIRT
Radar warning receiver indication of surface threat in search mode. See MUD and SINGER.^{** [A/S] [EW]}
DIRTY
1. Link is not encrypted.
2. Aircraft in landing configuration.^{* [A/A]}
3. Aircraft equipped with external stores (i.e., "DIRTY wings").^{* [A/A]}
DIVERT
Proceed to alternate base.
DOG [status]
Air towed decoy. (COLLARED): Decoy is retracted. (LEASHED): Decoy is extended. (SNIPPED): Decoy is severed from aircraft.^{** [A/A] [S/A]}
DONORIZE(D)
Aircraft data has been input into the host aircraft as a flight, team, or donor to enable target and/or data sharing among tactical data link participants.^{**}
DOUBLE TAP
Shoot two (2) air-to-air missiles (AAMs) into designated CONTACT, or 2 AAMs per CONTACT within a GROUP.^{** [A/A]}
[system] DOWN [location, direction]
Referenced emitter has stopped radiating at the stated location or along the stated bearing. Note: DOWN does not mean system destroyed.^{[EW]}
DRAG [cardinal direction]
Contact aspect stabilized at 0-59 degrees angle from tail or 121-180 degrees angle from nose.^{* [A/A]}
DRIVE-BY
Threat aircraft sensors or systems observed or in use (e.g., threat aircraft AAM shots observed).^{** [A/A] [A/S]}
DROP(PING)
1. Stop or stop(ing) monitoring of specified emitter or target or GROUP and resume(ing) search responsibilities.^{[A/A] [A/S]}
2. (TRACK number) Remove the emitter or target from tactical picture or track stores.^{[S/A]}
3. Remove a specific system or EOB category from search responsibilities.^{[EW]}
DUFFER
Direction finding equipped unit.^{[EW]}
DUST
Launch or post intercept debris from a ballistic missile. Location given in digital BULLSEYE format.^{** [S/A]}
DUSTOFF
Military medical aircraft.^{**}

== E ==
EAGLE
United States Navy ballistic defense missile.^{* [S/A]}
ECHELON [subcardinal direction]
Fill-in to a picture label describing GROUPS aligned behind and to the side of the closest GROUP.^{[A/A] [AIR-MAR]}
ECHO
Positive System M or Mode X (or comparable systems) reply.^{[A/A] [S/A]}
ELEVATOR [altitude]
Directive or request call to change altitude to the specified altitude in thousands of feet MSL.^{**}
EMPTY
No emitters of interest detected.^{[EW]}
ENGAGE
A fire control order used to direct or authorize units to fire on a designated target. Note: Not to be utilized in a Terminal Attack Control Type I or II CAS engagement. See CLEARED TO ENGAGE.
ENGAGED
Call from an aircraft maneuvering in the visual arena to relinquish deconfliction responsibilities.^{[A/A]}
ENGAGEMENT COMPLETE
Mandatory call from the attack aircraft to the JTAC or FAC(A) during Type 3 CAS terminal control indicating completion of ordnance release. See also CLEARED TO ENGAGE.^{** [A/S]}
EXPECT HOLLOW [time]
A condition will likely exist that limits video data link reception (e.g., maneuvers, terrain). Pass expected time of hollow in minutes.^{* [A/S]}
EXTEND(ING) [direction]
Short-term maneuver to gain energy, distance, or separation with the intent of reengaging.^{[A/A] [A/S]}
EYEBALL
1. Fighter with primary visual ID responsibility.^{[A/A]}
2. Electro-optical (EO), IR, or night vision device acquisition of an aircraft. Normally followed by number of aircraft observed (if more than one).^{[A/A]}
EYEBALL NARROW
EO or IR contacts are viewed in narrow field of view (FOV) and are too close for resolution via radar.^{** [A/A]}

== F ==
FADED
Sensor data is lost on GROUP or CONTACT. Requires information of last known position to include number of CONTACTS and TRACK direction.^{* [A/A] [S/A] [AIR-MAR]}
FAKER
A FRIENDLY track acting as a HOSTILE for exercise purposes.^{[A/A] [AIR-MAR]}
FALCON(S)
Partner nation forces.^{*}
FAN __ TACK __
Left and right hand edges of jammed sector are___and___.^{[EW]}
FARM
Helicopter status of fuel (expressed in PLAYTIME), ammunition, rocket, and missile (e.g., "Taz 31, FARM 2+00, 300, 14, 4"). See WHAT STATE.^{** [A/S]}
FAST
Target speed of 600-900 knots ground speed or Mach 1.0 to 1.5^{[A/A] [S/A]}
FATHER
Surface tactical air navigation station.^{* [AIR-MAR]}
FEELER
Shipborne fire control radar.^{[EW]}
FEET [WET/DRY]
Flying over water or land.
FENCE [IN/OUT]
Set cockpit switches as appropriate before entering or exiting the combat area.
FERRET
Airborne electromagnetic reconnaissance activity or aircraft.^{[EW]}
FIREBALL
Threat ballistic missile.^{** [S/S]}
FLANK [direction]
CONTACT aspect stabilized at 110-149 degrees angle from tail or 31-70 degrees angle from nose.^{* [A/A]}
FLASH
1. [state system] Temporarily activate specified system for ID purposes (e.g., identification, friend or foe (IFF)), afterburner, flare or chaff, etc.).^{[A/A]}
2. Clear the net immediately, critical information to follow (e.g., "FLASH, FLASH, FLASH this is Frontier 6, immediate MEDEVAC, grid to follow.").^{*}
FLASHLIGHT
Directive term for helicopter to turn on IR floodlight (pointed at ground to aid visual acquisition by escort aircraft).^{[A/S] [AIR-MAR]}
FLAVOR
Visually identified nationality of a CONTACT.
FLOAT(ING)
Expand(ing) the formation laterally within visual limits to maintain radar contact or prepare for a defensive response.^{[A/A]}
FLOCK
Two or more ROOSTERS.^{** [A/S] [EW] [S/A]}
FLOW [direction or heading]
Maneuver in stated direction or heading. Can be used to begin cold operations.^{[A/A]}
FLY-BY
Aircraft conduct low altitude pass abeam or overhead the vessel or location. See THUMP, PEPPER.^{** [A/S] [AIR-MAR]}
FOREST
Variable message format network.^{**}
FOX [number]
Simulated or actual launch of air-to-air weapon. (ONE): Semi-active radar-guided missile. (TWO): IR-guided missile. (THREE): Active radar-guided missile.^{[A/A]}
[2nd] FOX [number] SHIP
Simulated or actual missile launch against separate targets (assumes one missile per target). e.g., "SWORD 1-2, FOX THREE 2 SHIP". When "2nd" prefix is used, indicates simulated or actual launch of multiple missiles on the same target.^{[A/A]}
FOX MIKE
Frequency modulation (FM) radio.
FRIENDLY
A positively identified FRIENDLY aircraft, ship, spacecraft, or ground position.^{**}
FUEL STATE [time or pounds]
Aircraft fuel quantity, expressed in time or pounds, remaining until BINGO. FUEL STATE can be used as request for information. "FUEL STATE [time or pounds]" represents current status of platform.^{*}
FULL
Weapons system cannot support additional engagements due to reaching maximum allowable missiles away limit.^{** [S/A]}
FUMBLE
Observed weapons missing target or impacting without desired weapons effects (DWE).^{** [A/A] [A/S]}
FURBALL
1. Non-FRIENDLY aircraft and FRIENDLY aircraft are inside of five nautical miles of each other. Can be response to a DECLARE request.^{[A/A]}
2. Spacecraft are so close together that off- board sensors cannot distinguish relative positions.^{* [SO]}
FUZZY
Degradation of signal is occurring.^{** [SO] [EW]}

== G ==
GADABOUT [number]
Upper limit of height sanctuary for fighters in the missile engagement zone. "GADABOUT 25" means the upper limit of the height sanctuary is 25,000 feet (ft); "GADABOUT 16-24" means the height sanctuary is between 16,000 and 24,000 ft.
GADGET
Radar or emitter equipment.
GATE
Fly as quickly as possible, using after-burner or maximum power.
GENESIS [location]
Threat ballistic missile launch point.^{** [S/A] [S/S]}
GENEVA
A positively identified aircraft, ship, or ground position whose markings or signals indicate it is protected under the Geneva Conventions.^{**}
GENIE
Emitter is employing electromagnetic protection measures.^{[EW]}
GIMBAL
Sensor target is approaching azimuth or elevation tracking limits.^{* [A/A]}
GINGERBREAD
Voice imitative deception is suspected on this net.
GO ACTIVE
Initiate frequency hopping [e.g., HAVE QUICK II/Second Generation Anti-Jam Tactical Ultrahigh Frequency (UHF) Radio for North Atlantic Treaty Organization (SATURN)] operations.^{*}
GOALIE
A back-up guidance capable platform appointed to guide a weapon to the target if the primary platform's guidance system fails after weapons release.^{** [A/S]}
GOALIE, GOALIE, GOALIE [CALL SIGN]
Directive call from the primary weapon guidance platform for the appointed GOALIE to assume weapon guidance responsibilities. Only add CALL SIGN modifier if required.^{** [A/S]}
GOGGLE/DE-GOGGLE
Directive call for aircrew to put on or take off night vision-goggles.^{** [A/A] [A/S]}
GOGGLES [on/off]
An informative call that night-vision goggles are on/off.^{** [A/A] [A/S]}
GOODWILL
Boundary of an active FRIENDLY missile engagement zone.^{*}
GOPHER
A BOGEY that has not conformed to safe passage routing, airspeed, or altitude procedures. Will only be used when safe passage or minimum risk routing procedures are part of an ID matrix.^{* [A/A] [S/A]}
GORILLA
Large force of indeterminate numbers and formation of unknown or non-friendly aircraft.^{[A/A] [AIR-MAR] [S/A]}
GRANDSLAM
All HOSTILE CONTACT(S) of a designated track (or against which a mission was tasked) are destroyed.
GREEN
1. Direction of no known enemy threats; requires [direction] modifier.^{[A/A] [A/S] [AIR-MAR]}
2. Aircraft is at a weapon and/or fuel state that allows continued execution of the mission. Note: A specific loadout or fuel state should be determined during mission planning.^{* [A/A] [A/S] [AIR-MAR]}
GREYHOUND
FRIENDLY surface-launched cruise missile (e.g., Tomahawk land-attack missile).
GRIDIRON
Jamming signal appears on my precise position indicator scope or jamming signal prevents determination of range and bearing _____% of time.^{[EW]}
GROUP
1. Any number of air CONTACTS within 3 nautical miles in azimuth and range of each other.^{[A/A]}
2. Any number of surface CONTACTS within 1 nautical mile of each other.^{* [AIR-MAR]}
GUIDE [cardinal direction, location]
Directive term to intercept and move track of interest (TOI) as directed using International Civil Aviation Organization procedures.^{** [A/A]}
GUNS
Aircraft gun is being employed.^{[A/A] [A/S]}

== H ==
HANDSHAKE
1. Link 16 Air Control network participation group (NPG) initiation between air control unit and controlled aircraft.
2. Video data link established.^{[A/S]}
HARD [left, right, direction]
High-G-force, energy sustaining turn in the indicated direction (default is a 180-degree turn).
HEADBUTT [direction]
Directive term to immediately divert a TOI clear of a restricted or prohibited area.^{** [A/A]}
HEADS UP
Alert of an activity of interest.
HEAVY
A GROUP known to contain three or more CONTACTS.^{[A/A] [AIR-MAR]}
HIGH
CONTACT is greater than 40,000 ft MSL.^{[A/A] [S/A]}
HIT(S)
1. Momentary radar return(s).
2. (altitude) Indicates approximate altitude (e.g., GROUP BULLSEYE 360/10, HITS 15 thousand).^{[A/A]}
3. Weapons created the desired effects on the intended target.^{*}
HOLD DOWN
Key transmitter for direction-finding steer.
HOLD FIRE
An emergency fire control order to stop firing on a designated target and destroy missiles in flight. Note: CEASE FIRE does not destroy missiles in flight.^{*}
HOLDING HANDS
Aircraft in visual formation.^{* [A/A]}
HOLLOW
1. Any data link message not received.
2. Lost video data link.^{* [A/S]}
HOLSTER
Directive call to cancel shoot communications/shoot priorities.^{** [A/A]}
HOME PLATE
Home airfield or ship.
HOMING
Friends returning for recovery.
HOOK
1. [Direction] Perform an in-place, 180-degree turn.^{[A/A]}
2. [Track # or descriptor] Data link directive call to cue sensors to described point (e.g., point of interest, SAM, MARKPOINT, track number, etc.).
HOOTER
FRIENDLY jammer.^{[EW]}
HOSTILE
A contact identified as enemy upon which clearance to fire is authorized IAW theater rules of engagement (ROE). WARNING This use of HOSTILE is as a brevity term for air engagements and should not be confused with the same term in tactical data link identification.^{**}
HOT
1. Initiate or initiating a turn in the combat air patrol toward the anticipated threats.^{[A/A]}
2. Intercept geometry will result in passing in front of the target.^{[A/A]}
3. CONTACT aspect stabilized at 150-180 degrees angle from tail or 0-30 degrees angle from nose.^{*}
4. Defined area is expected to receive fire (enemy or FRIENDLY).
5. Ordnance employment intended or completed.
HOTDOG [color]
FRIENDLY aircraft is approaching or is at a specified standoff distance. (Color may indicate additional standoff distance). Follow briefed procedures.^{**}
HOTEL FOX
High frequency radio.
HOUNDDOG
Call made by an aircraft indicating aircraft is in a position to employ weapons. Used in response to COVER.^{** [A/A] [A/S] [AIR-MAR]}
HUSKY
Active radar missile is at high pulse repetition frequency active range.^{[A/A]}

== I ==
ICE
Call that the LZ or DZ has enemy activity below the prebriefed risk. Opposite of and cancels CHERRY.^{** [A/A] [A/S] [S/A]}
ID
1. Directive call to identify the target or track.^{[A/A] [AIR-MAR]}
2. (type) ID is accomplished, followed by type.^{[A/A]}
IDLE
Surface vehicles and/or vessels are stationary.
IMPACT [time]
1. Weapons observed impacting with unknown effects.^{** [A/S]}
2. Preemptive call with estimated time of impact.^{**}
IN [direction]
1. Turning toward a known threat. Opposite of OUT.^{[A/A]}
2. Entering terminal phase of an air-to-ground attack. Opposite of OFF.^{[A/S]}
INDEX
Unique number assigned to a tactical data link J12.6 message to differentiate between more than one POINT or MARKPOINT (e.g., "SCREWTOP 23, POINT INDEX 2 is disabled vehicle").^{**}
IN PLACE [direction]
Perform indicated maneuver simultaneously.^{[A/A]}
INSPECT
Establish visual contact with cockpit of TOI (implies closure inside 500 feet). Attempt communications and report all observations of activity. Note: Multiple passes may be required depending on TOI airspeed. Observed activities may include airspeed and altitude changes, structural damage, external lights, and aircraft configuration (gear or flaps).^{** [A/A]}
INTERROGATE
Interrogate the designated contact of the IFF mode indicated.
IN THE BLIND
A radio term indicating an agency/aircraft/unit is transmitting without having established two way communications with desired participants. May be utilized if experiencing radio jamming.^{**}
IN THE DARK
CONTACT is in known radar blind zone.
INTRUDER
An individual, unit, or weapon system in or near an operational or exercise area, which represents the threat of intelligence gathering or disruptive activity.
INVESTIGATE
1. Verify specified element(s) of ROE, positive identification (PID), collateral damage estimation (CDE), and/or coordination of forces on the referenced target or track.^{[A/S]}
2. Verify specified element(s) of ROE, PID, clear field of fire, and/or coordination of forces on the referenced target or track.^{** [AIR-MAR]}

== J ==
JACKAL
Surveillance Network Participating Group 7 (NPG 7) of Link 16 tactical digital information link.
JAM
Directive call to initiate jamming.^{** [EW]}
JAMMER
Non-friendly jammer.^{[EW]}
JELLO
Inverse synthetic aperture radar (SAR).
JESTER [color]
Joint Range Extension Applications Protocol (JREAP).(AMBER): JREAP-A(BROWN): JREAP-B(COPPER): JREAP-C
JINK
Perform an unpredictable maneuver to negate a tracking solution.^{[A/A] [A/S]}
JOINED
Two or more radar returns have come together.^{** [A/A]}
JOKER
Fuel state above BINGO at which separation, BUGOUT, or event termination should begin.^{*}
JONESING
Informative call requiring additional time to analyze current SAR map.^{** [A/S]}
JUDY
Aircrew has taken control of the intercept and only requires situation awareness information; controller will minimize radio transmissions.^{[A/A]}

== K ==
KICK [appropriate frequency]
Change radio or data link to a specified net or frequency, typically used for an unplanned change in frequency (e.g., CHATTERMARK). Also see PUSH.^{*}
KILL
In training, shooters are TALLY at assessed missile timeout.^{* [A/A] [S/A]}
KNOCK-IT-OFF
Cease all air combat maneuvers, attacks, activities, or exercises (training use only).
KOBE
Employment of FRIENDLY air-launched or surface-launched hypersonic weapon(s).^{** [A/S] [S/S] [AIR-MAR]}
KOMODO
A known EW target operating at a migrated frequency. The term does not imply direction or authority to engage.^{** [SO]}
KRAKEN
Employment of FRIENDLY air-launched, long-range (e.g., 100NM), subsonic antiship weapon(s). Option to add follow-on modifiers for number of munitions and/or time of flight. Note: Include launch location in BULLSEYE format and weapons track direction when appropriate.^{** [AIR-MAR]}

== L ==
LADDER
Picture label with three or more GROUPS on the same azimuth but separated by range. GROUP names should be LEAD GROUP, SECOND GROUP, THIRD GROUP, and TRAIL GROUP or LEAD GROUP, MIDDLE GROUP, and TRAIL GROUP.^{[A/A] [AIR-MAR]}
LAME DUCK
An aircraft in a minor state of emergency (e.g., an aircraft is troubleshooting a non-critical systems malfunction).
LASER ON
Directive call to start lasing.^{[A/S] [S/S]}
LASING
The speaker is firing the laser in response to LASER ON.^{[A/S] [S/S]}
LAST
C2 term that provides the last contact altitude from a high fidelity source (e.g., fighter radar).^{[A/A]}
LEAD-TRAIL
Inner GROUP formation of two CONTACTS separated in range.^{[A/A] [A/S] [AIR-MAR]}
LEAKER(S)
Airborne threat has passed through a defensive layer. Call should include amplifying information.^{[A/A] [S/A] [AIR-MAR]}
LEAN [direction]
Offset package or element in specified direction maintaining briefed altitude, airspeed, and formation.^{[A/A] [A/S]}
LEANING ON
A GROUP shows bias to one element over another.^{** [A/A]}
LEEROY
Timeline adjustment in minutes for entire mission; always referenced from original preplanned mission time; always means earlier. Opposite of ROLEX.^{**}
LEVEL
1. Contact is co-altitude (inter-flight call).
2. Briefed altitude has been reached.^{**}
[status] LIGHT
Mission status. (RED): Prebriefed threats have not been mitigated for further mission execution. Aircraft should evaluate their position relative to the threat and take appropriate actions. (YELLOW): Designated assets can continue to operate relative to the prebriefed threat while other assets should continue to hold. (GREEN): All aircraft are cleared to execute prebriefed missions.^{** ** [S/A]}
LIGHTS [ON/OFF]
Active radar system intentionally emitting/ceasing emissions. May be IAW briefed emissions control plan.^{** [EW]}
LIGHTBULB
Turn all position lights to bright.
LINE ABREAST
Inner GROUP formation of two or more contacts separated in azimuth.^{[A/A] [AIR-MAR]}
LINER
Fly at speed giving maximum cruising range.
LOCKED
1. (with GROUP label) Radar lock-on; SORT is not assumed.^{[A/A]}
2. (with position) Radar lock-on; correct targeting is not assumed.^{[A/A]}
LONG RIFLE
Employment of long range (e.g., 100 NM maximum range) air-to-surface munition with sustained propulsion (e.g., air-launched cruise missile). Option to add follow-on modifiers for number of munitions and/or time of flight. Note: Include launch location in BULLSEYE format and weapons track direction when appropriate.^{** [A/S]}
LOOKING
Aircrew does not have the ground or surface object, reference point, or target in sight (opposite of CONTACT).^{[A/S] [AIR-MAR]}
LOOK-THROUGH
To disengage to ensure parameters are still current.^{** [SO]}
LOST LOCK
Loss of host radar or IR lock-on.^{* [A/A]}
LOW
A CONTACT less than 5,000 ft above ground level.^{* [A/A]}
LOWDOWN
A request for the tactical electromagnetic support or ground/surface picture in an area of interest.^{** [EW]}

== M ==
MAGNUM [system, location]
Launch of FRIENDLY antiradiation missile.^{[A/S] [EW]}
MANEUVER [azimuth, range, altitude]
Specified GROUP is maneuvering in azimuth, range, and/or altitude.^{[A/A] [AIR-MAR]}
MAP
Directive call to initiate SAR mapping event on a specified point of interest.^{** [A/S]}
MAP COMPLETE
Informative call that air-to-surface radar completed mapping and waiting for the map to process/display. JONESING assumed.^{** [A/S]}
MAPPING
Multifunction radar in an air-to-ground mode.^{[A/S]}
MARK
1. Record the location of a point or object of interest.
2. Spotting round, normally white phosphorus or illumination on the deck to indicate targets to aircraft, ground troops, or fire support.^{** [A/S] [S/S]}
3. Challenge and response term for requested aircraft to report contrails.^{** [A/A]}
MARKPOINT
Data link non-designated geographic point of interest (J12.6 status information discrete (SID) 9 message).
MARSHAL(LING)
Establish(ing) at a specific point, typically used to posture forces in preparation for an offensive operation.
MATCH [type]
Overlay requested target designator type (e.g., MATCH SPARKLE, MATCH LASER).^{* [A/S] [S/S] [AIR-MAR]}
MATE
Positively identified as an ASSUMED FRIEND IAW theater ID criteria.^{**}
MELD
1. Bias radar coverage IAW briefed parameters.^{* [A/A]}
2. Shift radar responsibilities from sanitizing to gaining situational awareness on the assigned GROUP.^{* [A/A]}
3. Directive call to another aircraft to match sensor location.^{[A/S] [AIR-MAR]}
MERGE(D)
FRIENDLIES and targets have arrived in the visual arena.^{[A/A]}
METALLICA
1. Informative call that contact cannot be targeted due to EA.^{**}
2. Radar indication of jamming of A/A beyond visual range (BVR) employment.^{** [A/A]}
MICKEY
UHF radio frequency hopping time of day signal (e.g., HAVEQUICK II, SATURN).
MIDNIGHT
C2 sensors are unavailable due to degradation. Opposite of SUNRISE.^{[A/A] [S/A]}
MILLER TIME
Completion of A/S ordnance delivery. Generally used by the last striker in conjunction with a precoordinated egress plan.^{[A/S]}
MINIMIZE
The radio frequency is becoming saturated, degraded, or jammed and briefer transmissions must follow.
MIRROR BEAM
GROUPs in azimuth that maneuver to a beam opposite each other.^{** [A/A] [AIR-MAR]}
MONITOR(ING) [GROUP or object]
1. Maintain(ing) sensor awareness on specified GROUP or object. Implies that tactically significant changes will be communicated.^{[A/A] [A/S]}
2. Maintain contact or targeting information on a maritime surface contact.^{* [AIR-MAR]}
MOON BEAM
After-the-fact advisory report to indicate a spillover or reflection of laser energy that occurred on a specific target.^{**}
MOSQUITO
Slow speed and low radar cross section target.^{* [A/A] [S/A]}
MOTHER
Parent ship.^{[AIR-MAR]}
MOVER(S)
Unidentified surface vehicle(s) in motion.
MUD [type with direction, range if able]
1. Radar warning receiver ground threat displayed with no launch indication.^{[A/S] [EW]}
2. Radar warning receiver indication of surface threat in track mode. See DIRT and SINGER.^{* [A/S] [EW]}
MUDDY
Denial on all channels of multiplexed signal.^{** [SO]}
MUSIC
Radar electromagnetic deceptive jamming.^{* [A/A]}

== N ==
NAILS [direction]
1. Radar warning receiver indication of airborne interceptor radar in search.^{[A/A]}
2. 2.75-inch flechette rockets.^{* [A/S]}
NAKED
No radar warning receiver indications.^{[A/A]}
[weapon] NEGATE
FRIENDLY surface-to-air weapons platform is unable to engage specified target (e.g., EAGLES NEGATE). Opposite of AFFIRM.^{** [S/A]}
NEGATIVE LASER
Laser energy has not been acquired.^{[A/S]}
NEGLECT
Used by ship to indicate the last salvo was fired on incorrect data.^{** [S/S]}
NEUTRAL
A positively identified aircraft, ship, or ground position whose characteristics, behavior, origin, or nationality indicate it is neither supporting nor opposing FRIENDLY forces.^{**}
NEW PICTURE
Used by controller or aircrew when tactical PICTURE has changed. Supersedes all previous calls and reestablishes PICTURE for all players.^{[A/A] [A/S] [AIR-MAR]}
[object] NO FACTOR
Stated [object] is not a threat.^{[A/A] [A/S] [S/A]}
NO JOY
1. Aircrew does not have visual contact with the TARGET or BANDIT. Opposite of TALLY.^{* [A/A] [A/S] [S/A] [SO]}
2. Indicates that radio communications could not be established with the distant end on a specified radio net.^{*}
NOTCH(ING) [direction]
Aircraft is in a defensive position. Maneuver(ing) with reference to a threat.^{* [A/A] [A/S] [S/A]}

== O ==
OCCUPIED
Ground equipment present at tasked target location. Opposite of VACANT.^{[A/S]}
OFF [direction]
Attack is terminated, and maneuvering to the indicated direction.^{[A/A] [A/S]}
OFFSET [direction]
Maneuver in a specified direction with reference to the target.
OPENING
Increasing separation.^{[A/A]}
OUT [direction]
Directive or informative call indicating a turn to a cold aspect relative to the known threat. Used in launch-and-leave tactics and for all flight members to execute.^{* [A/A]}
OUTLAW
CONTACT has met point of origin criteria for ROE.^{[A/A] [S/A]}

== P ==
PACKAGE
Geographically isolated collection of GROUPs outside of briefed range.^{[A/A]}
PACMAN
Fighters have found the end of the threat formation and are converting; given in bearing and range from the BULLSEYE.
PADLOCKED
Aircrew cannot take eyes off an aircraft, ground target, or surface position without risk of losing TALLY or VISUAL.
PAINT(S)
An interrogated GROUP or radar contact that is responding with any of the specified IFF, or selective ID feature modes and correct codes established for the ID criteria.^{[A/A] [AIR-MAR] [MAR]}
PANCAKE
Land or request to land (reason may be specified; e.g., PANCAKE AMMO, PANCAKE FUEL).
PARROT
IFF selective ID feature transponder.^{*}
PASSING
Two GROUPs initially separated in range, decrease range separation and are passing each other.^{[A/A]}
PEDRO
Combat search and rescue helicopter.^{*}
PEPPER
Directive call for an aircraft to strafe 1,000 feet ahead of the bow of a vessel.^{* [AIR-MAR]}
PHANTOM
A position track derived from the triangulation of SPIKES originating from HOSTILE jamming.^{[EW]}
PICTURE
A request to provide information pertinent to the mission in a digital bullseye format unless briefed otherwise.^{* [A/A] [A/S] [AIR-MAR]}
PIG(S)
FRIENDLY glide weapon(s) (e.g., standoff weapon, guided bomb unit, small diameter bomb). See (weapon) AWAY.^{* [A/S] [AIR-MAR]}
PIGEONS [bearing, range]
Bearing in magnetic and range in nautical miles to HOME PLATE.
PILLOW
Pulse repetition interval.^{[EW]}
PINBALL
Laser guided munition has separated from its launching vehicle and captured laser designator.^{** [A/A] [A/S]}
PINCE
Threat maneuvering for a bracket attack.^{** [A/A]}
PING
Precision-guided munition has established communication link with supporting vehicle.^{** [A/S]}
PINNACLE
An emission believed to originate from a platform assumed to be FRIENDLY.^{[EW]}
PINPOINT
Request that the maritime air controller provide target coordinates via latitude and longitude.^{** [AIR-MAR]}
PITBULL
Active radar guided missile (e.g., air intercept missile [AIM]-120) is at medium pulse repetition frequency (also known as MPRF) active range.^{[A/A]}
PITCH / PITCHBACK
Execute a nose-high heading reversal.^{[A/A]}
[left/right] PLAYMATE
Cooperating aircraft.^{*}
PLAYTIME
Amount of time aircraft can remain on station, given in hours plus minutes (e.g., ONE PLUS THIRTY equals 1 hour and 30 minutes).
[freq] POGO [freq]
Switch to communication channel number preceding POGO. If unable to establish communications, switch to channel number following POGO. If no channel number follows POGO, return to this channel.
[type] POINT
Data link sensor point or TOI, such as the J12.6 SID 10 data link message. CONTACT POINT: Indicates the aircraft has acquired the TOI TRACK NUMBER on their data link. DROP POINT: Data link target sorting message is no longer needed or desired. HOLD POINT: Maintain weapons quality track data. SHOOT POINT: Directive call to shoot data link targeting message; does not imply targeting responsibility. TARGET POINT: Target the referenced data link TARGET sorting message. (Example: "IRON FOUR, TARGET IRON ONE'S POINT").^{**}
POND
Carry out jamming plan indicated or IAW previous orders.^{[EW]}
POP
1. Starting climb for A/S attack.^{[A/S]}
2. Maximum performance climb out of low-altitude structure.^{[A/A]}
POPCORN
Combat search and rescue aircraft departing the LZ. Usually followed by a number of recovered personnel, (e.g., STING 1, POPCORN PLUS 2).
POPEYE
1. Flying in clouds or an area of reduced visibility.
2. Reduced EO/IR visibility due to atmospherics.^{*}
POP-UP
1. GROUP that has suddenly appeared between the MELD and threat range.^{* [A/A]}
2. Criteria used as a self-defense method, within the ROE, to protect FRIENDLY air defense elements from HOSTILE aircraft.^{** [S/A]}
POSIT
Request for FRIENDLY position; response in terms of a geographic landmark or from a common reference point.
POST ATTACK [direction, directive]
Desired direction or directives after completion of intercept or engagement.
POST HOLE
Rapid descending spiral.^{[A/A]}
[type] POSTURE
Communicates sensor posture type (offensive, defensive, or neutral) by the JTAC to assets. Does not imply the FRIENDLY ground forces' tactical situation.^{** [A/S]}
PRESS
1. Requested action is approved and mutual support will be maintained, assumes VISUAL.^{[A/A]}
2. Requested action is approved and mutual support will be maintained.^{[A/S]}
PRINT [type]
Valid non-cooperative target recognition reply.^{[A/A] [S/A]}
PULSE
Illuminate(ing) a position with flashing IR energy.
PUMP
A briefed maneuver to minimize closure on the threat or geographical boundary with the intent to reengage.^{* [A/A]}
PUPPIES
Emission control plan is modified as follows.^{[EW]}
PURE
Pure pursuit is being used or a directive to go pure pursuit.^{[A/A]}
PUSH [channel]
Switch to designated frequency; no acknowledgment required.
PUSHING
Departing designated point.^{[A/A]}

== Q ==
QUAIL
HOSTILE air- or surface-launched cruise missile.^{** [A/S] [S/S]}

== R ==
RACKET
Intercepted electromagnetic emission which has been assigned to a number of the track block.^{[EW]}
RANGE
A PICTURE label describing two GROUPs separated in distance along the same line of bearing. GROUP names will be LEAD GROUP or TRAIL GROUP.^{[A/A] [AIR-MAR]}
RAYGUN [position, heading, altitude]
1. Radar lock-on to unknown aircraft.^{[A/A]}
2. A request for a BUDDY SPIKE reply from FRIENDLY aircraft meeting these parameters.^{[A/A]}
RECYCLE [system]
Directive call for aircrew to turn IFF or selective ID feature or specified system off and on.^{**}
RED
Aircraft is at weapon and/or fuel state that is insufficient to continue execution of the mission. Note: A specific loadout or fuel state should be determined during mission planning.^{** [A/A] [A/S] [AIR-MAR]}
REDWOOD [HOT or COLD]
An informative or directive call to initiate (HOT) or cease (COLD) the integration of FRIENDLY surface-to-air fires into a fighter or joint engagement zone without further coordination. Must include modifier HOT or COLD. Note: Friendly aircraft are expected to maintain an appropriate standoff following a REDWOOD HOT call, unless the acceptable level of risk permits otherwise.^{** [S/A]}
REFERENCE [direction or heading]
Assume stated direction or heading.
REFINE
Request for better location accuracy on an emitter of interest.^{** [EW]}
REMINGTON
1. Aircraft is out of, or unable to employ remaining air-to-air ordnance, not to include gun (if equipped).^{** [A/A]}
2. No ordnance remaining except gun or self-protection ammunition.^{[S/A] [MAR]}
RENEGADE
A civil platform that is assessed as operating in such a manner as to raise suspicion that it might be used as a weapon.
RENT
Report of characteristics of an intercepted signal.^{[EW]}
REPEAT
1. (During adjustment) Fire again using the same method and volume of fire.^{** [S/S]}
2. (During fire for effect) Fire the same number of rounds using the same method and volume of fire.^{** [S/S]}
REPORTED [information]
Information provided is derived from an off-board source.
RESET
Proceed to a prebriefed position or area of operations.^{[A/A] [S/A] [SO]}
RE-STAKE
Drive a new STAKE at the target centroid reported with direction of travel and elevation. Initiated by aircrew.^{[A/S]}
RESUME
Resume last formation, route, or mission ordered.^{[A/A]}
RETROGRADE (ING)
Withdraw(ing) while executing defensive procedures in response to a threat.^{*}
RIDER
A BOGEY that is complying with airspace control order or safe passage procedures.^{[A/A] [S/A]}
RIFLE [number, time]
Employment of short range (e.g., < 100 NM maximum range) air-to-surface munition. Option to add follow-on modifiers for number of munitions and/or time of flight. Note: Include launch location in BULLSEYE format and weapons track direction when appropriate.^{* [A/S] [AIR-MAR]}
RIPPED CHUTE
Sent by spotter to indicate that the illumination round parachute was ripped or separated on deployment.^{** [S/S]}
RIPPLE
Two or more munitions will be released or fired in close succession. Typically associated with number and type of weapon with release interval. Note: Normally discussed during the prestrike game plan between aircraft and/or between aircraft and ground tactical controller.^{* [A/S] [S/A] [AIR-MAR]}
ROBBER
A surface vessel that is identified as an enemy IAW theater ID criteria. The term does not necessarily imply clearance to engage.^{** [AIR-MAR]}
ROGER
Radio transmission received; does not indicate compliance or reaction.
ROLEX
Timeline adjustment in minutes for entire mission; always referenced from original preplanned mission execution time; always means later. Opposite of LEEROY.^{*}
ROOSTER
Enemy antiradiation missile.^{** [A/S] [EW] [S/A]}
ROPE
Circling an IR pointer around an aircraft to help the aircraft identify the FRIENDLY ground position. CAUTION This technique may damage night-vision devices.^{[S/A]}
ROTATOR
Moving target indicator returns that signifies a high probability of a rotating antenna.^{[EW]}
ROVER
Platform is Remotely Operated Video Enhanced Receiver (ROVER) video downlink capable.
RUMBA
1. Radar has detected jamming or mutual interference but has not resolved the type.^{* [A/A]}
2. Own-ship maneuvering for ranging.

== S ==
SADDLED
Wingman or element has returned to briefed formation position.^{[A/A]}
SAM [direction]
Visual acquisition of a SAM in flight or a SAM launch; should include position.
SAME
Aircrew has the identical information as was just stated.
SANDWICHED
Aircraft or element is between opposing aircraft or elements.^{[A/A]}
SATURATED
Weapons system radar has exhausted all resources. Ability to detect new tracks is minimal.^{** [S/A]}
SAUNTER
Fly at best endurance.
SCAN
Search sector indicated and report any CONTACTS.^{[A/S]}
SCORPION
Enemy man-portable air defense system (MANPADS).^{** [S/A]}
SCRAM [direction]
1. FRIENDLY asset is in immediate danger. Withdraw clear in the direction indicated for survival. No further mission support from the FRIENDLY asset is expected.
2. Cease the intercept and take immediate evasive action. Implies that the target aircraft is being engaged by SAMs or other air defense fighters.^{** [A/A] [S/A] [EW]}
3. Directive term to instruct air traffic control to clear all civilian or nonengagement aircraft outside a specific area. TERMINATE SCRAM will resume normal operations.^{** [A/A]}
SCRAMBLE
Takeoff as quickly as possible.^{[A/A] [S/A] [S/S]}
SCRUB
Moving target indicator return that signifies a low, slow (100-250 knots ground speed) or very slow (<100 knots ground speed) airborne target.^{[A/A] [S/A]}
SEAD
Execute the contracts of prebriefed suppression of enemy air defense (SEAD).^{** [A/S]}
SEPARATE (ING)
Leave(ing) a specific engagement; may or may not reenter.^{[A/A]}
SEPARATION
1. Request for separation between two GROUPS. Response will include the follow-on GROUPS separation, altitude, and fill-ins.^{[A/A]}
2. (Range/Azimuth) SEPARATION: Indicates relationship between GROUPS and separation if GROUPS and relationships in a label were not defined previously or if relationship between GROUPS has changed.^{** [A/A]}
SET
1. Set (or have set) a particular speed. May be indicated in knots or Mach.
2. No longer slewing sensor and awaiting further updates.
3. Overwatch aircraft is in position.^{**}
SHACKLE
One weave; a single crossing of flight paths; maneuver to adjust or regain formation parameters.^{[A/A]}
SHADOW
Follow indicated TARGET.
SHIFT [direction, track, number]
Shift laser, IR, radar, device energy, or aim point. Note: Can be used to shift from the offset position onto the target. Also used during multi-aircraft attack to shift laser energy or target assignments.^{[A/S] [AIR-MAR]}
SHOOT
Directive communication to employ weapons on a contact, does not invoke targeting.^{** [A/A]}
SHOOTER
Aircraft or unit designated to employ ordnance.
SHOPPING
An aircraft request to forward air controller, JTAC, or C2 platform for a target or task.^{[A/S]}
SHOT
Round(s) has/have been fired.^{** [S/S]}
SHOTGUN
Prebriefed weapons state.^{[A/A] [A/S] [S/A]}
SHOULDER
An inherently offensive tactic used to physically force a vessel to alter course or stop. The goal of shouldering is to gently nudge an uncooperative vessel in a new direction to prevent it from traveling on its intended course, and to comply with orders to stop or change course. Skin-to-skin contact is anticipated.^{** [MAR]}
SHREW
Persistent interference from an undetermined source that is degrading situational awareness on the current radio channel.^{**}
[system] SICK
System indicated is degraded or partially operative. Canceled by SWEET.^{**}
SIDE KICK
A directive call to initiate manned-unmanned teaming if the air-to-air relationship and communications link has not been established. Modifiers include 1 to 4 to describe the level of interoperability.^{** [A/A]}
[system] SILENT
1. (time) System will be unavailable for time indicated.^{[A/A]}
2. Data link is, or should be placed, in receive only.
3. Broadcast station is not transmitting. May also be used as an order and must be followed by a frequency or station designator. If possible, it should be followed by an estimated time of return to the air.^{[EW]}
SINGER [type, direction]
Radar warning receiver indication of SAM launch. See MUD and DIRT.^{[A/S] [EW]}
SINGLE
One GROUP, CONTACT, etc.
SKATE
Call to execute launch and leave tactics at a prebriefed range. Modifiers include LONG, SHORT, or QUICK.^{[A/A]}
SKINNY
Current survivor coordinates.
SKIP IT
Directive call for a specific platform to not engage the indicated track. Usually followed with further directions.
SKOSH
Aircraft is out of or unable to employ active radar guided missiles.^{[A/A]}
SKUNK
A maritime or ground CONTACT that has not yet been identified.^{* [A/S] [AIR-MAR]}
SLANT
References number of people or objects noted at specified location (men/women/children). For example, in response to a request for SLANT on a target building: "SLANT 4/6/4."^{**}
SLAPSHOT [type, bearing]
Immediately employ a best available antiradiation missile against a specified threat at the specified bearing.^{[A/S] [EW]}
SLEDGEHAMMER
Request from a surface vessel for immediate air support. Once SLEDGEHAMMER is called by the defended surface vessel, air assets will be re-rolled from other missions to identify threat intentions and employ if necessary in an armed reconnaissance/air interdiction/strike coordination and reconnaissance role.^{** [AIR-MAR]}
SLEW
Move sensor in direction indicated (usually accompanied with a unit of measure). For example, "SLEW left one half screen."^{**}
SLICE / SLICEBACK [left/right]
Perform a high-G descending turn in the stated direction, usually 180-degree turn.^{[A/A]}
SLIDE
1. Continue(ing) present mission while flowing from station in response to perceived threat, implies intent to RESET.^{[A/A] [EW] [SO]}
2. Directive or descriptive term to laterally reposition helicopter.^{* [A/S]}
SLIP(PING)
Time delay to individual flight or element event.^{[A/A] [A/S]}
SLOPE
Pulse repetition frequency.^{[EW]}
SLOW
Target with ground speed of 100-250 knots.^{* [A/A] [S/A]}
SMACK
Clearance to employ ordnance or fires on surface target coordinates. Link-16 track, ROE, PID, CDE, clear field of fire, coordination of forces, and commander's guidance requirements on the referenced target or track have been satisfied. Not to be utilized in a CAS engagement.^{[A/S] [S/S] [AIR-MAR]}
SMASH [ON/OFF]
Turn on/off anti-collision lights.
SMELL
Low confidence identification.^{**}
SMOKE
Smoke marker used to mark a position.^{[A/S]}
SNAKE
Oscillate an IR pointer in a figure eight about a target.^{[A/S]}
SNAP
1. Fighter request for immediate BRAA call (with appropriate fill-ins) to the GROUP described. Indicates fighter intent to intercept or join.^{[A/A]}
2. [heading] Urgent directive call to turn to a heading.
SNAPLOCK [BRAA]
Informative call indicating fighter has obtained a radar contact inside briefed threat range with BEAM, FLANK, or HOT aspect and is unable to complete sanitization responsibilities implying ownership. A SNAPLOCK call should be responded to with BRAA.^{* [A/A]}
SNEAKER
An intelligence-gathering vessel.^{[EW]}
SNIFF [type]
Passive sensor indication of a radar emitter.^{[A/A] [EW]}
SNIPER [type, location (range, bearing)]
Aircraft to employ a range known antiradiation missile against a specified threat at the specified location.^{[A/S] [EW]}
SNOOZE
Initiate(ing) emission control procedures. Opposite of ALARM.^{[A/A] [EW] [SO]}
SORT
1. Assignment of responsibility within a GROUP; criteria can be met visually, electromagnetically (e.g., radar), or both.^{[A/A]}
2. Assignment of specific targeting responsibilities.^{* [A/S]}
SORTED
Sort responsibility within a GROUP has been met.^{[A/A] [A/S] [AIR-MAR]}
SOUR
1. (mode/type) Invalid or no response to an administrative IFF or selective ID feature check.^{[A/A] [S/A]}
2. (link name) (e.g., TIMBER SOUR) Potential problems with net entry; initiates pre-mission link troubleshooting. Opposite of SWEET.
SPADES
An interrogated GROUP or radar contact that lacks all of the air tasking order (or equivalent) IFF or selective ID feature modes and codes required for the ID criteria.^{[A/A] [S/A] [AIR-MAR]}
SPARKLE
1. Mark or marking target by IR pointer.^{[A/S] [S/S]}
2. Platform is IR pointer capable.
SPIDER
Cooperative engagement capability network.^{**}
SPIKE [direction]
Radar warning receiver indication of an air interceptor threat in track or launch.^{* [A/A]}
SPIN
Execute(ing) a timing or spacing maneuver.^{[A/A]}
SPITTER [direction]
An aircraft that has departed from the engagement or is departing the engaged fighter's targeting responsibility.^{[A/A]}
SPLASH(ED)
1. Hit observed with valid DWE against a target.^{[A/A] [A/S] [S/A]}
2. Informative call to observer or spotter 5 seconds prior to estimated time of impact.^{* [S/A] [S/S]}
SPLIT
Flight member is leaving formation to pursue a separate attack; VISUAL may not be maintained.^{*}
SPOOFER
An entity employing electromagnetic or tactical deception measures.^{[A/A] [EW]}
SPOOFING
Voice deception is being employed.^{[S/A] [EW]}
SPOT
1. Acquisition of the reflected laser energy.^{[A/S]}
2. Platform is laser spot tracker capable.
SPREAD
A GROUP maneuver where all contacts remain at a FLANK or HOT aspect.^{** [A/A]}
SPUR RIDE
Attempt helicopter buddy or self-extraction by having downed crew attach themselves to the outside of the helicopter.^{** [A/S]}
SQUAWK [mode, code]
Operate IFF/selective ID feature as indicated or IFF or selective ID feature is operating as indicated.
SQUAWKING [mode number]
BOGEY is responding with an IFF or selective ID feature mode or code other than that prescribed by the air tasking order or ID criteria.^{*}
SQUIRTER
A ground-borne object of interest departing the objective area.^{** [A/S] [S/S]}
STACK
1. Two or more CONTACTS within a GROUP criteria with an altitude separation in relation to each other (typically >=10,000 foot separation).^{[A/A]}
2. Request all airborne players and their assigned altitude block in the specified area.^{*}
STAKE
1. Reference point for A/S targeting operations.^{* [A/S]}
2. A full-motion video system mark has been set and is used as a frame of reference.^{*}
STALKER
A BANDIT with counterspace capability that has significantly refined orbital parameters required to engage a high-value asset.^{** [SO]}
STANDOFF [role]
Call to execute stated role (SEAD/SUPPORT/TARGET) and remain outside of a prebriefed coordination range from known SAM locations.^{** [A/A] [A/S] [EW]}
STARE [laser code, reference point]
Cue the laser spot search or tracker function on the specified laser code in relation to the specified reference point. Reference point may include the following: steerpoint, geographic reference, bearing and range, or data link point.^{**}
STATUS [phase]
1. Request for an individual's tactical situation.
2. Request for amplifying information on current task or aircraft state (e.g., respond with WORKING, JONESING, CONTACT, CAPTURE, TARGETED, LOCKED, CLEAN, ENGAGED, FUEL (RED/YELLOW/GREEN), WEAPON (RED/YELLOW/GREEN) ready or plain English).^{*}
STEADY
Stop oscillation of IR pointer.^{[A/S]}
STERN
Requests for, or directive to, intercept using STERN geometry.^{[A/A]}
STIFF ARM
Fighter adjusts intercept flow to avoid package or threat group.^{** [A/A]}
STINGER
1. Three-ship inner GROUP formation with two lead CONTACTs line abreast and the SINGLE in trail.^{[A/A] [AIR-MAR]}
2. A US infrared MANPADS.^{* [S/A]}
STRADDLE
A spotting of STRADDLE is made for a multi- gun salvo when some rounds fall short and some fall beyond the target. The spotter announces STRADDLE followed by a correction to place the mean point of impact on the target. The term is normally used during a ship adjust or a massed fire mission.^{** [S/S]}
STRANGER
Unidentified traffic that is not a participant in the action in progress.^{[A/A]}
STRANGLE [system]
Turn off system indicated (e.g., STRANGLE PARROT).
STRENGTH
Numerical strength of a TRACK or GROUP.^{[A/A] [A/S] [S/A] [AIR-MAR]}
STRIPPED
Aircraft is out of prebriefed formation.^{* [A/A]}
STROBE(S) [bearing]
Radar indication(s) of noise jamming.^{[A/A]}
STROKE
Directive call for third party track production source to provide best possible continuous track data for weapon targeting purposes.^{** [A/S] [AIR-MAR]}
SUMMIT
The highest point of a shell's trajectory, also known as maximum ordnance (MAX ORD), is the apex of its flight. Sent as standard during an air observed mission and if requested by a ground spotter. Units of measurement are specified. A new SUMMIT is sent if it changes by more than 300 ft for an air observer or 100 meters for a ground observer.^{** [S/S]}
SUNRISE
C2 sensors are available. Opposite of MIDNIGHT.^{[A/A] [S/A]}
SUNSHINE
Illuminating target with artificial illumination.^{[A/S]}
SUPPORT
Execute prebriefed support contracts.^{**}
SUPPORTING
Speaking unit or element is assuming a supporting role, is in a position to influence the outcome, and assumes deconfliction responsibility.^{[A/A]}
SUSPECT
An identity applied to a track that is potentially hostile because of its characteristics, behavior, origin, or nationality.
SWEET
1. (mode, type) Valid response to an administrative IFF or selective ID feature check request.^{[A/A] [S/A]}
2. (link name) (e.g., TIMBER SWEET) Confirms receipt of data link information.
3. Equipment indicated is operating efficiently.(Opposite of SOUR; cancels SICK, BENT).
SWEPT [subcardinal direction]
Inner GROUP formation with the trailer displaced approximately 45 degrees behind the leader.^{[A/A] [AIR-MAR]}
SWITCH [item]
1. Switch the setting on the referenced item.
2. (CAMERA) Switch full-motion video to EO or IR.^{*}
3. (POLARITY) Switch IR polarity to black hot or white hot.^{*}
4. Formation or element change to preplanned frequency.
SWITCHED
Attacker is changing from one aircraft to another.^{[A/A]}

== T ==
TAG
1. Response to an emitter ambiguity resolution request (COLOR). Requires [system, location].^{[EW]}
2. Call to a helicopter flight lead that the last aircraft of a flight is airborne.^{*}
TALLY
Sighting of a target, non-friendly aircraft, or enemy position. Opposite of NO JOY.
TALON
US Army Terminal High Altitude Area Defense (also known as THAAD) missile.^{** [S/A]}
TARGET
1. Assignment of targeting responsibilities.^{[A/A] [A/S] [S/A] [AIR-MAR]}
2. ROE, PID, coordination of forces, and commander's guidance requirements on the referenced target or track have been satisfied. Target or track correlation, CDE, and clear field of fire must be accomplished prior to employing ordnance or fires.^{[A/S] [S/S] [AIR-MAR]}
TARGETABLE
Advisory call to inform package that the ability to TARGET has been met IAW prebriefed contracts; must be briefed by package commander (or outlined in SPINS/standards).^{** [A/S]}
TARGETED
Fighter has acquired assigned GROUP and has assumed responsibility for it.^{* [A/A]}
TECHNICAL
Improvised fighting vehicle (usually civilian vehicles modified with mounted weapons).^{**}
TEN SECONDS
Standby for (weapon) ON call in approximately 10 seconds (e.g., LASER ON, TORCH ON).^{[A/S]}
TERMINATE
In training, cease local engagement without affecting the overall exercise.^{[A/A]}
TESLA
Mode 5 IFF.^{**}
THREAT [direction]
Untargeted HOSTILE, BANDIT, or BOGEY is within a briefed range of a FRIENDLY aircraft.^{[A/A]}
THROTTLES
Reminder to set throttles appropriately considering the IR threat and desired energy state.^{[A/A]}
THUMP
Aircraft conducts low-altitude, high- speed pass over or abeam a designated vessel and does not cross the bow. Supersonic airspeed is authorized as long as damage is not anticipated.^{** [AIR-MAR]}
TIED
Positive radar contact with element or aircraft.^{[A/A]}
TIGER
Enough fuel and ordnance to accept a commit.^{[A/A]}
TIMBER
Link 16 Network.^{[EW]}
TIMECHECK
Check or change IFF code.
TIMEOUT
1. Shooter assesses valid BVR shot parameters have been met and missile has reached termination.^{** [A/A] [S/A]}
2. Munition impact is obscured and impact cannot be confirmed and time of flight has elapsed.^{** [A/S]}
TOGGLE [system]
Execute the briefed setting change on specified system.
TORCH
1. Friendly high-energy laser (HEL) weapon fire.^{**}
2. Platform is HEL weapon capable.^{**}
3. Request for HEL fires on a specified target (e.g., JTAC Alpha request TORCH).TORCH ON/OFF: Friendly HEL weapon has started/ceased firing.^{**}
TOY
High-speed antiradiation missile targeting system (also known as HTS) pod.^{[EW]}
TRACK [direction]
1. GROUP or CONTACTS direction of flight or movement.^{** [A/A]}
2. Directive call assigning responsibility to an asset for maintaining sensor or visual observation of a defined object or area.^{** [A/S] [S/S]}
3. Rotary-wing directive call to establish race track (e.g., "Taz 31, TRACK left).^{** [A/S]}
4. Information call stating direction of vehicle or CONTACT in motion (e.g., TALLY TECHNICAL TRACK Northwest).^{** [A/S] [AIR-MAR]}
TRACKING or [system] TRACKING
1. IR lock-on.^{* [EW] [S/A]}
2. Enemy air defense system is maintaining situational awareness on FRIENDLY.^{*}
TRACK NUMBER [number]
Data link information file.
TRASHED
FRIENDLY missile has been defeated.^{* [A/A] [S/A]}
TRAVEL
Change radar frequency.^{[EW]}
TRESPASS [system, position]
The addressed flight is entering the threat SAM ring of a specific (system) at the stated location. A specified FRIENDLY spacecraft is entering into a collection area and/or weapons engagement zone of a known or suspected threat object.^{** [EW] [SO]}
TROJAN
Deployment of air launch decoy.^{**}
TSUNAMI
Three or more WAVES.^{** [A/A]}
TUMBLEWEED
Request for information due to limited or loss of situational awareness, (e.g., NO JOY, BLIND).
TWEET(ING)
An aircraft transmitting Mode S, Automatic Dependent Surveillance-Broadcast (also known as ADS-B), or reference data (e.g., Federal Aviation Administration registration).^{** [A/A]}

== U ==
UNABLE
Cannot comply as requested or directed.
UNIFORM
UHF radio.

== V ==
VACANT
Ground equipment not present at specific or tasked target location. Opposite of OCCUPIED.^{[A/S]}
VAMPIRE
Hostile air- or surface- launched antiship missile.^{[A/S] [AIR-MAR] [MAR] [S/S]}
VANISHED
Special case of FADED defined as a GROUP or ARM or CONTACT with no available sensor data and is:(1) Not in a known sensor blind zone (terrain masking or Doppler blind zone) AND(2) Correlated to a shot by FRIENDLY forces.^{** [A/A] [S/A]}
VECTOR [heading]
Alter heading to indicated.
VERY FAST
Target speed greater than 900 knots ground speed or Mach 1.5^{[A/A] [S/A]}
VERY SLOW
Target speed less than 100 knots.^{** [A/A] [S/A]}
VIC
Picture label with three GROUPS with the single closest in range and two GROUPS, AZIMUTH split, in trail. GROUP names should be LEAD GROUP and NORTH TRAIL GROUP and SOUTH TRAIL GROUP or EAST TRAIL GROUP and WEST TRAIL GROUP.^{[A/A] [AIR-MAR]}
VICTOR
Very high-frequency (also known as VHF) / amplitude modulation (also known as AM) radio.
VISUAL
Sighting of a FRIENDLY aircraft or ground position or ship. Opposite of BLIND.

== W ==
WAGON [left/right]
Rotary-wing directive call to orbit around the target (e.g., "Taz 31, WAGON left").^{** [A/S]}
WALL
Picture label with three or more GROUPS primarily split in azimuth. GROUP names should be NORTH GROUP, MIDDLE GROUP, SOUTH GROUP or WEST GROUP, MIDDLE GROUP, EAST GROUP.^{[A/A] [AIR-MAR]}
WARNING [color]
Air defense warning. Hostile attack is:(RED): Imminent or in progress.(YELLOW): Probable.(WHITE): Improbable.
WATCHING
Surface to air defense unit is assigned a target for engagement responsibility; is unable to engage due to threat range; will engage when threat meets engagement criteria. WATCHING is an optional response to COVER when accepting engagement assignment but unable to respond AFFIRM.^{** [S/A]}
WAVE
One or more follow-on GROUPS in a coordinated, defense-in-depth tactic. WAVES are numbered sequentially (e.g., "First WAVE, second WAVE").^{** [A/A]}
WEAPONS [status]
1. Directive to report or set weapons control status. Each status defines the conditions under which weapons may be fired, in accordance with Rules of Engagement (ROE):^{*}
2. FREE: At targets not identified as FRIENDLY
3. TIGHT: At targets positively identified as HOSTILE.
4. HOLD/SAFE: In self-defense or in response to a formal order.
WEDGE
Three-ship inner GROUP formation with a single CONTACT closest in range and two trail CONTACTs line abreast.^{[A/A] [AIR-MAR]}
WEIGHTED [cardinal direction]
Fill-in for a CHAMPAGNE, VIC, WALL, or LADDER when one or more GROUPS are out of position or offset from the standard picture label.^{[A/A] [AIR-MAR]}
WHAT LUCK
Request for results of missions or tasks.
WHAT STATE
Request for air-to-air missile inventory and fuel status. The standard response format is: [# of active radar missiles], [# of semi-active radar missiles], [# of infrared-guided missiles] by [fuel remaining (in thousands of pounds to one decimal point)] e.g., "BLUE 4-4 is 3-1-2 by 7 decimal 5" is equivalent to three AIM-120s, one AIM-7, two AIM-9s, gun with ammunition, and 7,500 lbs. of fuel remaining. Other weapons, expendables, or oxygen levels are reported only if requested or critical.^{[A/A]}
WIDE
Separation between the farthest GROUPS in azimuth in a relative formation of three or more GROUPS, used to describe a WALL, VIC, CHAMPAGNE, or BOX.^{[A/A] [AIR-MAR]}
WILCO
Will comply with received instructions.
WINCHESTER
No ordnance remaining.
WOOD
Situation awareness data link network.^{**}
WOOFER
Off board active radar decoy.^{[EW]}
WORDS
Directive calls or interrogative requests regarding further information or directives pertinent to the mission or operating area. Generated by the tactical command and control agencies and outlined in the theater-specific SPINS.
WORK
1. Maneuver in the stated cardinal direction.^{** [A/A]}
2. Directive call to command geolocation.^{** [EW]}
WORKING
1. (system with location) Platform gathering EOB on a designated emitter.^{[EW]}
2. Platform executing electronic ID on a specific aircraft or GROUP to obtain ID necessary for BVR employment.^{[A/A]}

== Y ==
YARDSTICK
Use Tactical air navigation system (TACAN) for ranging.^{[A/A]}
YELLOW
Aircraft is at a weapon and/or fuel status that is approaching a level insufficient to continue execution of the mission. Note: A specific loadout or fuel state should be determined during mission planning.^{** [A/A] [A/S] [AIR-MAR]}

== Z ==
ZAP
Request for data link information.
ZIPLIP
Limit transmissions to critical information only.
ZOOM [in/out]
Increase or decrease the sensor's focal length. Note: ZOOM IN/OUT is normally followed by "ONE, TWO, THREE, or FOUR" to indicate the number of FOVs to change.^{[EW]}

== See also ==
- List of established military terms
- Glossary of military abbreviations
- Glossary of RAF code names
