= Point =

Point or points may refer to:

== Mathematics ==
- Point (geometry), a representation of an exact position in a physical or mathematical space
- Point, or element, in category theory, the generalized concept of a set element
- Decimal point

== Places ==
- Point, Cornwall, England, a settlement in Feock parish
- Point, Lewis, a peninsula in the Outer Hebrides, Scotland
- Point, the northeast tip of the Inner Hebrides island of Lismore, Scotland
- Point, Texas, a US city

== Business and finance ==
- Point (loyalty program), a form of currency used as a purchasing incentive
- Point (mortgage), a payment made up front in exchange for a reduced interest rate

== Measurement units ==
- Point (gemstone), 2 milligrams, or one hundredth of a carat
- A unit of card stock thickness
- Point, 1/100 of an inch, formerly used to describe rainfall in Australia
- Point (typography)
- Points, an antler's size by the number of its tips
- Printer point, a unit of relative exposure in photography

== Navigation ==
- One of the 32 directional points of the compass
- Point of sail, a sailing craft's direction of travel in relation to wind direction
- Point, the direction of an object by its clock position

== Sports ==
- Point, in sports scoring
  - Point (American football)
  - Point (basketball)
  - Point (ice hockey)
  - Point (pickleball)
  - Point (tennis)
  - Points (association football)
- Point (cricket), a fielding position
- Point guard, in basketball
- The point (ice hockey), a player location

== Technology and transport ==
- Point, a data element in a SCADA system
- Points, a contact breaker in an ignition system
- Points, a railroad switch (British English)
- A penal point assessed for a driving offense
- An archaeological projectile point
- Public Oregon Intercity Transit, styled POINT, a public transit system

== Arts, entertainment, and media ==
=== Music ===
- Point (Cornelius album), 2001
- Point #1, a 1999 album by Chevelle
- Point Music, a record label
- Points (album), 1990, by jazz pianist Matthew Shipp
- "The Points" (song), a 1995 single and video from the Panther soundtrack
- Point (Yello album), 2020
- "Point", a song by the American band Bright from their self-titled album

=== Other uses in arts, entertainment, and media ===
- High card points, used for hand evaluation in contract bridge
- Le Point, a French weekly
- Point Broadcasting, a radio broadcasting company
- Pointe technique, in ballet

== Other uses ==
- Full point, point, or period, a punctuation mark
- Point (coat color), animal fur coloration of the extremities
- Point (geography), a peninsula or headland
- Point (surname)
- Point, a pointing dog's stance when signalling a quarry's location
- Point, as in "take point", the literal or figurative front person in a military or other endeavor
- Point University, West Point, Georgia

== See also ==
- List of mathematical properties of points
- Critical point (mathematics), a stationary point of a function of an arbitrary number of variables
- Point-free geometry
- Stationary point, a point in a single-valued function where the value of the function ceases to change
- Basis point, 1/100 of one percentage point
- Percentage point, the arithmetic difference between two percentages
- Pivot point (technical analysis), a price level used to analyze stock market movement
- Paris point, used for shoe sizes
- Interpoint, a punctuation mark
- Endpoint (disambiguation)
- Lapointe (disambiguation), also Lepoint/La Pointe/Le Point
- Midpoint (disambiguation)
- Point Lookout (disambiguation)
- Pointing (disambiguation)
- Points system (disambiguation)
- Start Point (disambiguation)
- The Point (disambiguation)
- Tipping point (disambiguation)
- . (disambiguation)
- Dot (disambiguation)
- Period (disambiguation)
