= Fort Pitt Bridge =

Bridge over the Monongahela River in Pittsburgh, Pennsylvania

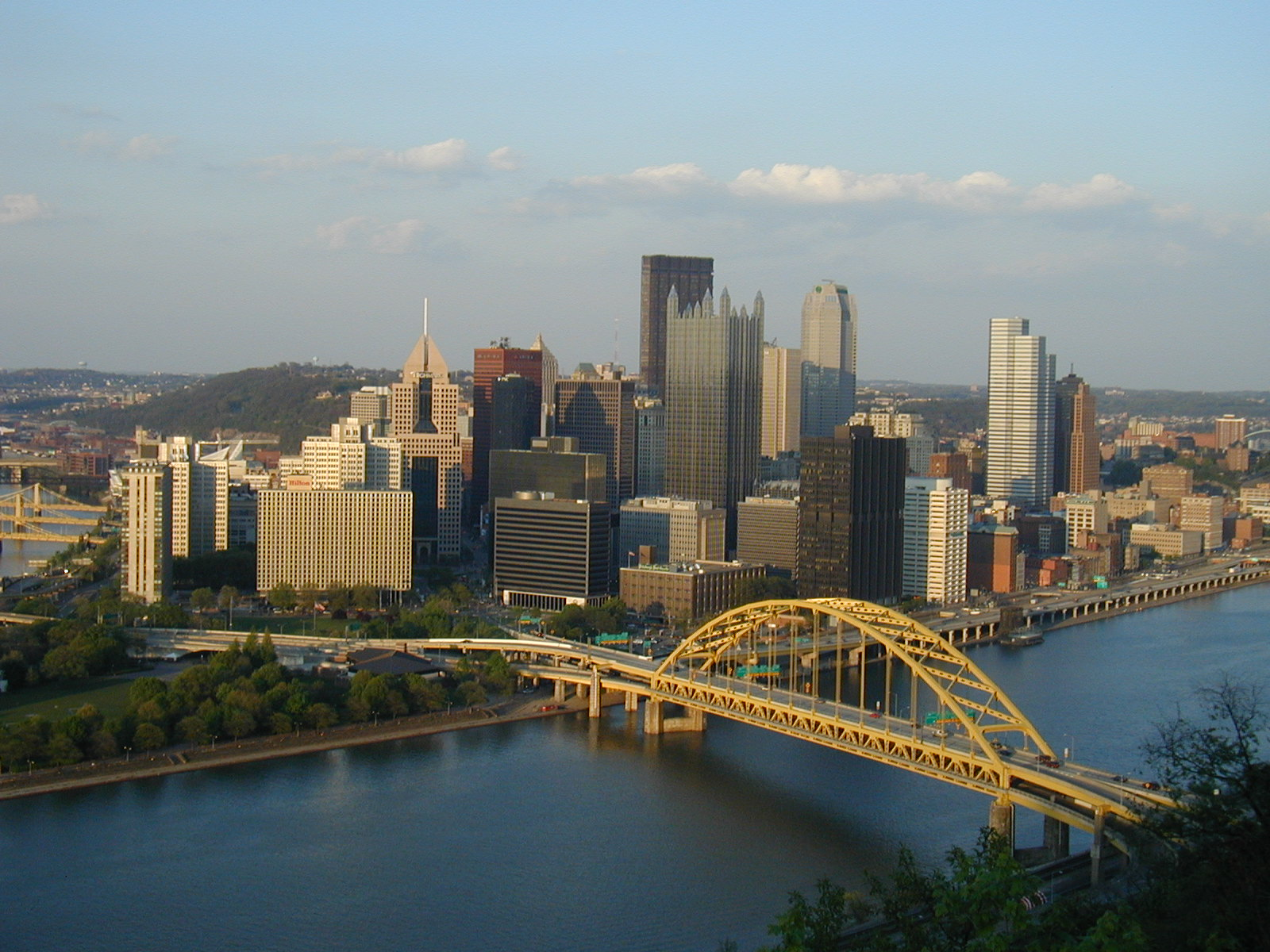
- Coordinates: 40.43883°N 80.01113°W
- Carries: 8 lanes (4 upper, 4 lower) of I-376 / US 22 / US 30 / US 19 Truck
- Crosses: Monongahela River
- Locale: Pittsburgh, Pennsylvania
- Official name: Fort Pitt Bridge
- Other name: Parkway West #1
- Maintained by: PennDOT

Characteristics
- Design: Double-decked Steel Bowstring Arch bridge
- Total length: 1,207 feet (368 m)
- Height: 479 feet (146 m)
- Longest span: 750 feet (230 m)
- Clearance below: 47.1 feet (14.4 m)

History
- Construction cost: $6,305,000
- Opened: June 19, 1959
- Replaces: Point Bridge

Statistics
- Daily traffic: 150,000

Location
- Interactive map of Fort Pitt Bridge

The Fort Pitt Bridge is a steel, double-decked bowstring arch bridge that spans the Monongahela River near its confluence with the Allegheny River in Pittsburgh, Pennsylvania. It carries Interstate 376 between the Fort Pitt Tunnel and Downtown Pittsburgh. Opened in June 1959 as a replacement for the Point Bridge, the Fort Pitt Bridge was the world's first computer-designed bowstring arch bridge and double-decked bowstring arch bridge. The bridge is known for its difficult lane changes, especially on the lower level, often requiring people to go from the extreme left lane across two lanes to the extreme right lane in only 700 feet. The upper level is more forgiving for some routes but still requires a full span lane change in 700 feet to get from the south side entrance to the downtown exits.

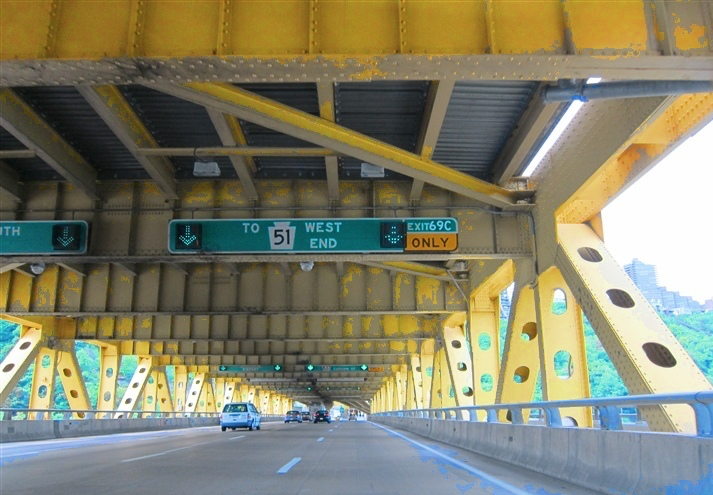
View of the lower level of the Fort Pitt Bridge.

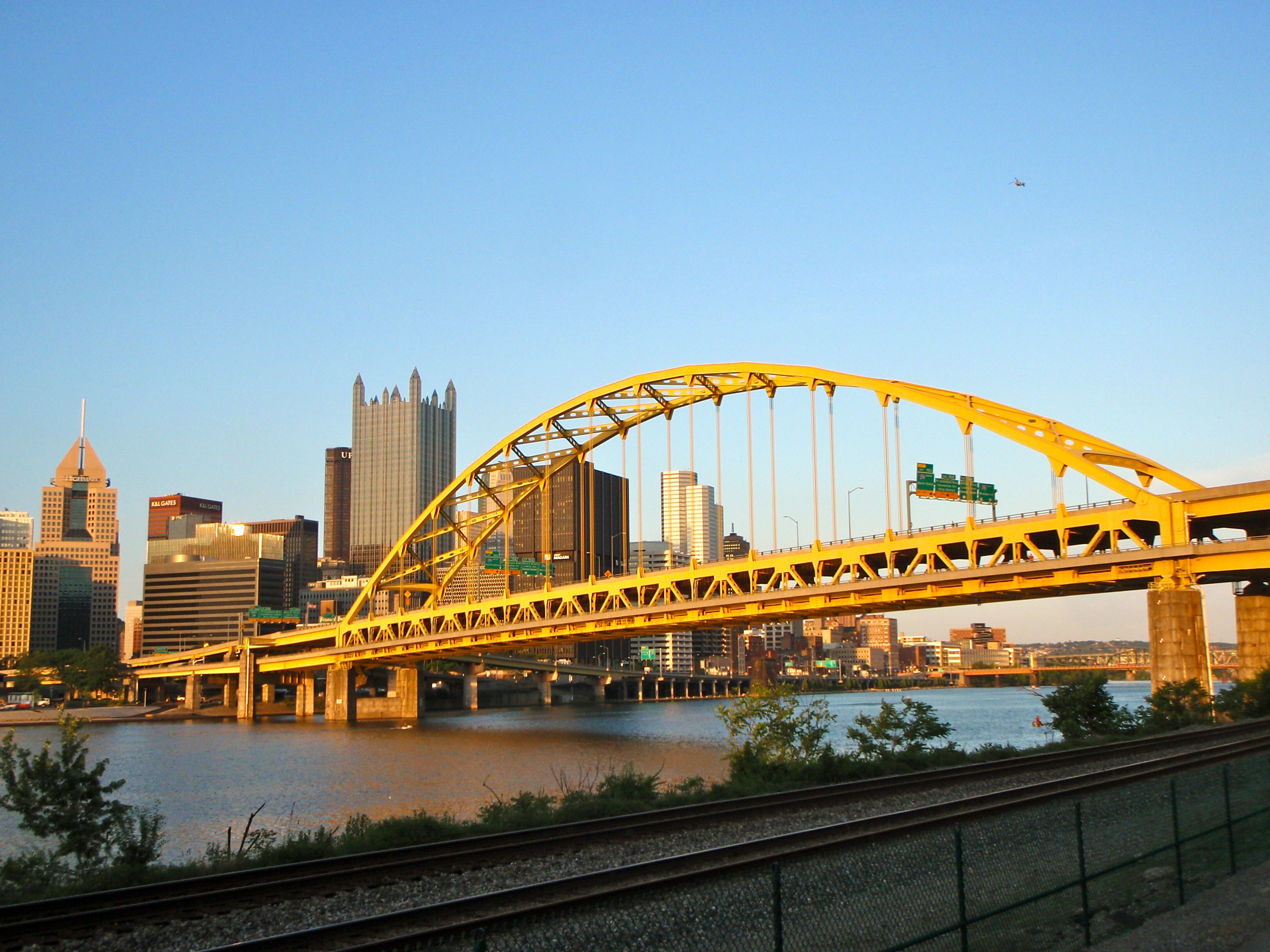
The Fort Pitt Bridge from the South Shore

== History ==
The $6.305 million Fort Pitt Bridge, designed by George S. Richardson of Richardson, Gordon, & Associates, opened at 11 a.m. on June 19, 1959, with a ribbon-cutting ceremony by Gov. David L. Lawrence before a caravan, including Mayor Thomas Gallagher and mayoral candidate Joseph M. Barr, was driven across while a city fireboat gave a hose salute upriver. Its two predecessor bridges, the original Point Bridge (1877–1924) and its replacement of the same name (a.k.a. Point Bridge II, 1927–1959), spanned even closer to the aforementioned confluence from West Carson Street (near the Duquesne Incline) to Water St. (now Fort Pitt Blvd.), near the tip of Point State Park. The Point Bridge closed two days after the opening of the Fort Pitt Bridge. Still, it remained standing until it was dismantled (along with the connected Manchester Bridge) in 1970.

Until the opening of the Fort Pitt Tunnels on September 1, 1960, outbound traffic was routed onto West Carson St. (PA 837 North), heading towards the West End.

At the time of opening, the bridge contained 8,066 tons of steel, including 4,950 tons of structural carbon steel and 1,305 tons of steel reinforcing rods. The contractors included U.S. Steel's American Bridge Co., John F. Casey Co., Dinardo Inc., Fort Pitt Bridge Co., and J.C. Jackanic Inc.

== Popular culture ==
The Fort Pitt Bridge is part of a sequence from The Song Remains the Same (1976), a documentary of Led Zeppelin's 1973 tour. Many other Pittsburgh landmarks are also shown, including the Liberty Bridge and its tunnels.

It also features prominently in the 2012 film The Perks of Being a Wallflower.

The bridge also appears in the 1993 film Striking Distance and the 2011 film Abduction.

The early promotional images for The Last of Us used this bridge as a recognizable landmark to show that the game would be partially set in and around Pittsburgh. During the game, the characters use the bridge in the distance as a landmark for their destination out of the city.

== See also ==
- List of crossings of the Monongahela River
- Bridges of Pittsburgh
- Fort Pitt Tunnel
