= Point Park =

Point Park may refer to:

- Point Park, a portion of Chickamauga and Chattanooga National Military Park on Lookout Mountain in Tennessee
- Point State Park, in downtown Pittsburgh, Pennsylvania, United States
  - Point Park University, a university in Pittsburgh, named after the park
