= Points system =

Points system may refer to:

- Point system (driving), where penalty or demerit points are accrued for traffic offences
- Points system (cricket)
- Point System (nautical)
- Points-based immigration system
- List of motorsports points scoring systems
- List of American Championship car racing point scoring systems
- List of FIM World Championship points scoring systems
- List of Formula One points systems
- List of NASCAR points scoring systems
- Group tournament ranking system with points for matches won, goals scored, etc.
- Central Applications Office, points system for Leaving Certificate students applying to enter third-level education in Ireland

== See also ==
- Point (disambiguation)
