= The Point =

The Point may refer to:

== Buildings and venues ==
- The Point, Cardiff, a music venue in Wales
- The Point Theatre, Dublin, former name of 3Arena, an indoor amphitheatre
- The Point, Eastleigh, a theatre and dance studios in Hampshire, England
- The Point, Milton Keynes, an entertainment complex in Buckinghamshire, England
- The Point, Panama City, an all-residential building in Panama
- The Point (Utah), a mixed-use development area currently under construction
- The Point, Aberdeen, an apartment building in Scotland
- Point State Park in Pittsburgh, Pennsylvania, called The Point by natives
- The Point, a conference facility and landmark at Old Trafford Cricket Ground, Manchester, England
- United States Military Academy, known as "West Point" or "the Point"

== Places ==
- Covington, Kentucky, originally known as The Point
- The Point, Louisville, a neighborhood in Louisville, Kentucky
- The Point or Easton's Point, a historical neighborhood in Newport, Rhode Island

== Entertainment and media ==
=== Radio ===
- WCYT (91.1 FM The Point), a nonprofit music and educational station in Fort Wayne, Indiana
- KKPT (94.1 FM The Point), a classic-rock radio station in Little Rock, Arkansas
- WJLK-FM (94.3 FM The Point), an adult top-40 radio station in Asbury Park, New Jersey
- WKBE (100.3 FM The Point), an alternative radio station in Warrensburg, New York
- WTBV (formerly 101.5 FM The Point), in the Tampa Bay, Florida area
- KPNT (105.7 FM The Point), an alternative-rock radio station in St. Louis, Missouri
- KHPT (106.9 FM The Point), a radio station in Conroe, Texas
- The Point (radio network), in Vermont
- The Point (radio show), a Canadian current affairs program (2008–2009)

=== Other uses in entertainment and media ===
- The Point (film), a 2006 docufiction film
- The Point!, a 1971 animated film, album, and musical by Harry Nilsson
- The Point (magazine), an American literary magazine
- The Point (2021 TV series), a studio show about the National Hockey League
- The Point (the Gambia), a newspaper
- The Point, a band featuring Nicke Andersson and Neil Leyton
- The Point with Mark Hyman, political commentary TV segments airing 2001–2006

== Other uses ==
- The point (ice hockey), a player position
- Public Oregon Intercity Transit, styled The POINT, a public transit system
- The POINT Community Development Corporation, in the South Bronx
- The Point, precursor company to Groupon

== See also ==
- Point
- The Points
