= Start Point =

Start Point or Start point may refer to:

== Promontories ==
- Start Point, Devon, near Dartmouth on the south coast of Devon, England
- Start Point, Cornwall, near Tintagel on the north coast of Cornwall, England
- Start Point, Livingston Island on Livingston Island, Antarctica
- Start Point, Sanday, in the Orkney Islands, Scotland

== Other uses ==
- Start point (yeast), the point in the cell-division cycle of yeast when cells are committed to division
- Restriction point, also known as the start point, in cells

== See also ==
- Starting Point (disambiguation)
- Midpoint (disambiguation)
- Endpoint (disambiguation)
- Start (disambiguation)
- Point (disambiguation)
