= Fort Pitt (Pennsylvania) =

Historic British fort in present-day Pittsburgh, PA, USA during the Seven Years' War

Coordinates: 40.4411°N 80.0090°W

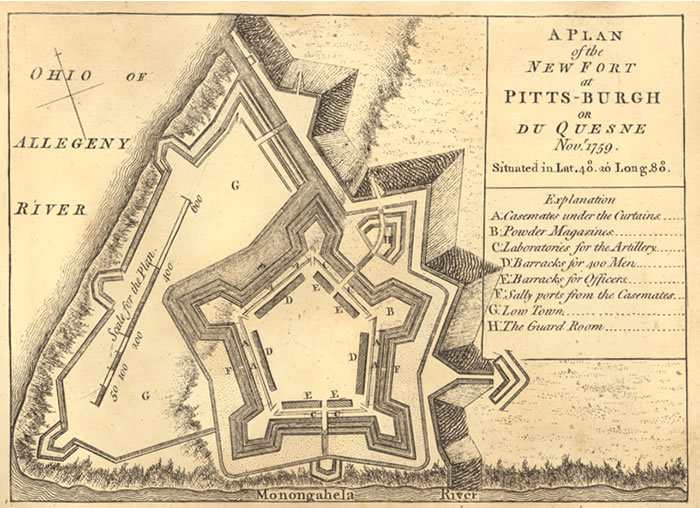
A Plan of the New Fort at Pitts-Burgh drawn by cartographer John Rocque in 1765

Fort Pitt was a fort built by British forces between 1759 and 1761 during the French and Indian War at the confluence of the Monongahela and Allegheny rivers, where the Ohio River is formed in western Pennsylvania (modern day Pittsburgh). It was near (but not directly on) the site of Fort Duquesne, a French colonial fort built in 1754 as tensions increased between Great Britain and France in both Europe and North America. The French destroyed Fort Duquesne in 1758 when they retreated under British attack.

Virginia colonial protection of this area ultimately led to the development of Pittsburgh and Allegheny County, Pennsylvania, by British-American colonists and immigrants.

== Location and construction ==
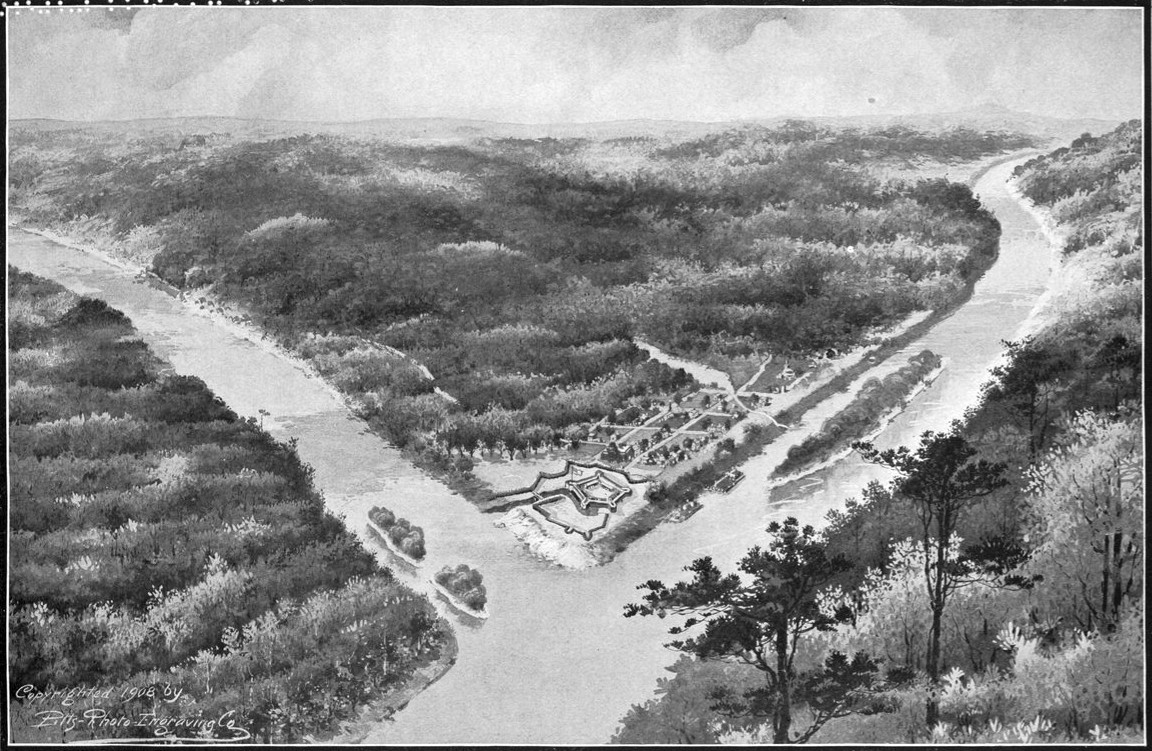
Artist's interpretation of Fort Pitt in 1759 with the Allegheny (left) and Monongahela (right) rivers. At their confluence is the Ohio River, seen at the bottom.

In April 1754, the French began building Fort Duquesne on the site of the small British Fort Prince George at the beginning of the French and Indian War (AKA Seven Years' War). The Braddock expedition, a 1755 British attempt to take Fort Duquesne, met with defeat at the Battle of the Monongahela at present-day Braddock, Pennsylvania. The French garrison later defeated an attacking British regiment in September 1758 at the Battle of Fort Duquesne. French Colonel de Lignery ordered Fort Duquesne destroyed and abandoned at the approach of General John Forbes' expedition in late November.

A number of factors contributed to this strategic withdrawal. In August 1758 the French Fort Frontenac, at the head of Lake Ontario, was captured by British Gen. Bradstreet, severing the supply lines to French fortifications across the frontier. Fort Duquesne was the southernmost of these. Short on materiel, French commander François-Marie Le Marchand de Lignery was forced to dismiss elements under his command down the Ohio River to their bases in Illinois and Louisiana, and send others overland north to Ft. Presque Isle. Those Native who may have remained at Fort Duquesne were likely eager to return to their winter longhouses before the weather changed. Consequently, the fort was further undermanned, possibly left with as few as 200 regulars.

The late October Treaty of Easton with several Native tribes involved in the war largely dissolved the alliance that had enabled French military dominance in the region. Chiefs of 13 American Indian nations agreed to negotiate peace with the colonial governments of Pennsylvania and New Jersey and to abandon any alliances with the French. The nations were primarily the Six Nations of the Iroquois League, bands of the Lenape (Delaware), and the Shawnee. They agreed to the treaty based on the colonial governments' promising to respect their rights to hunting and territory in the Ohio Country, to prohibit establishing new settlements west of the Appalachian Mountains, and to withdraw British and colonial military troops after the war.

The French commander, anticipating an attack along Braddock's road, had spent some effort fortifying positions there. (Forbes had several times advanced men along that route as a feint.) From prisoners captured during Maj. James Grant’s catastrophic attack on Fort Duquesne, de Lignery was reportedly surprised to learn of a fortified encampment of British troops only 50 miles away at Ligonier, Pennsylvania, with substantial reserves behind. He was also certainly cognizant of the British lightning raid on the Native village of Kittanning (40 miles north on the Allegheny River) two years earlier. Thus, a British attack from the north was a distinct possibility. Forbes had indeed contemplated an attack further north on Fort Machault (later, Ft. Venango; modern-day Franklin, PA.)

Finding himself in an under-manned, flood-prone fort in a weak defensive position, vulnerable to attack from three directions, and running low on provisions, de Lignery retreated north. He destroyed the stores and many of the structures as 1500 advance British troops under the command of Forbes drew within 10 miles. The French never returned to the region.

After constructing the temporary Mercer's Fort, the British built a new fort and named it Fort Pitt, after William Pitt the Elder. The fort was built from 1759 to 1761 during the French and Indian War (Seven Years' War), next to the site of former Fort Duquesne. It was built in the popular pentagram shape, with bastions at the star points, by Captain Harry Gordon, a British Engineer in the 60th Royal American Regiment.

== Pontiac's War ==
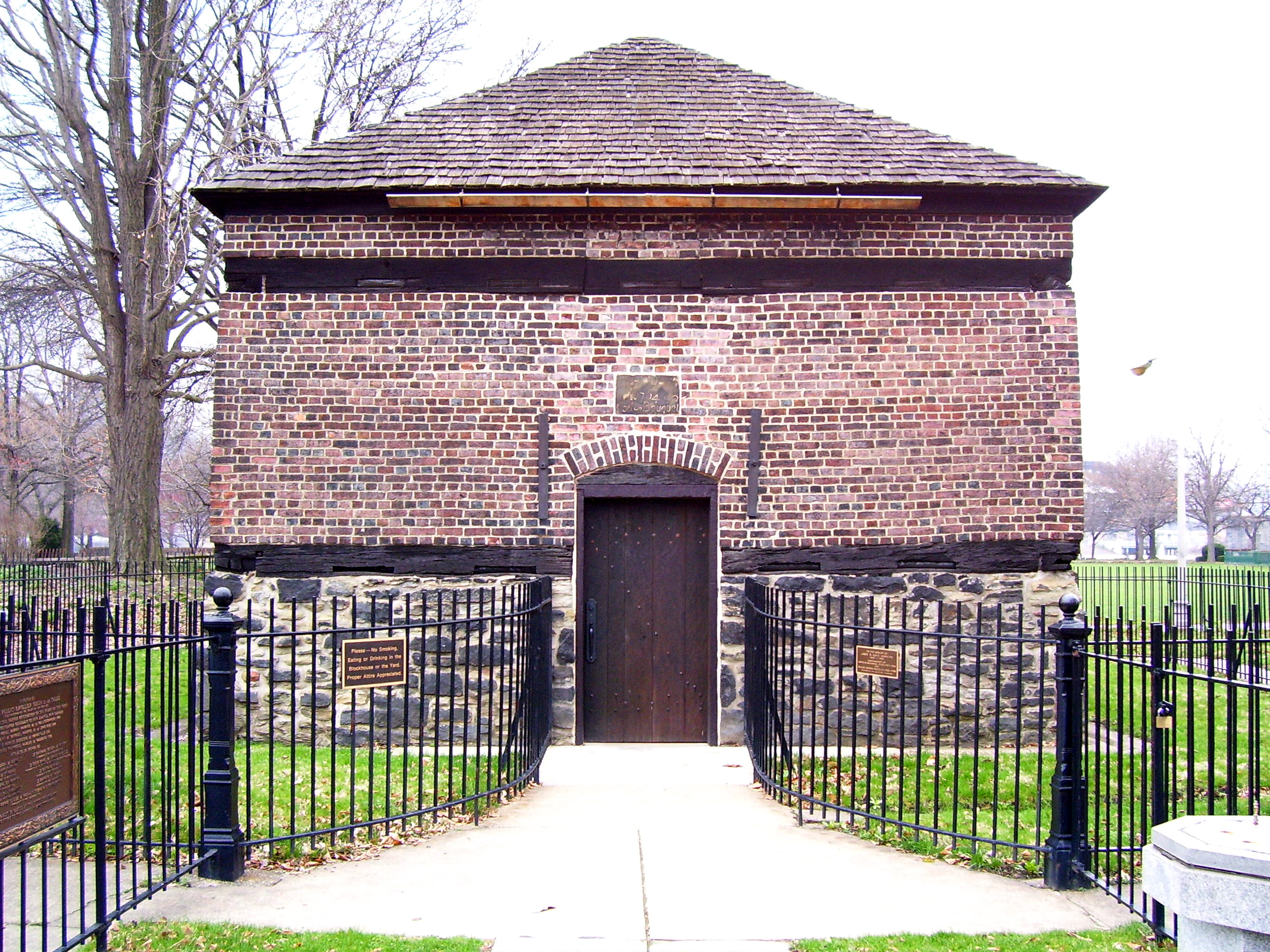
Fort Pitt Blockhouse, constructed in 1764

After the colonial war and in the face of continued broken treaties, broken promises and encroachment by the Europeans, in 1763 the western Lenape and Shawnee took part in a Native uprising known as Pontiac's War, an effort to drive settlers out of the Native American territory. The American Indians' siege of Fort Pitt began on June 22, 1763, but they found it too well-fortified to be taken by force. In negotiations during the siege, Captain Simeon Ecuyer, a Swiss mercenary and the commander of Fort Pitt, gave two Delaware emissaries blankets that had been exposed to smallpox. The potential of this act to cause an epidemic among the American Indians was clearly understood. Commander William Trent wrote that he hoped "it will have the desired effect." Colonel Henry Bouquet, leading a relief force, would discuss similar tactics with Commander-in-Chief Jeffery Amherst. The effectiveness of these attempts to spread the disease are unknown, although it is known that the method used is inefficient compared to respiratory transmission, and it is difficult to differentiate from naturally occurring epidemics resulting from previous contacts with colonists.

During and after Pontiac's War, epidemics of smallpox among Native Americans devastated the tribes of Ohio Valley and the Great Lakes areas. On August 1, 1763, most of the American Indians broke off the siege to intercept the approaching force under Colonel Bouquet. In the Battle of Bushy Run, Bouquet fought off the American Indian attack and relieved Fort Pitt on August 10.

In 1772, after Pontiac's War, the British commander at Fort Pitt sold the building to two colonists, William Thompson and Alexander Ross. At that time, the Pittsburgh area was claimed by the colonies of both Virginia and Pennsylvania, which struggled for power over the region. After Virginians took control of Fort Pitt, they called it Fort Dunmore, in honour of Virginia's Governor Lord Dunmore. The fort served as a staging ground in Dunmore's War of 1774.

== American Revolutionary War and beyond ==
During the American Revolutionary War, Fort Pitt served as the American headquarters for the western theater of the war, while British forces garrisoned Fort Detroit at the present-day location of Detroit, Michigan.

By 1777, the Continental Congress had learned of efforts by Governor Henry Hamilton, British commander of the garrison at Fort Detroit, to incite Ohio country Indian nations and local American Loyalists against the lightly guarded American western border and feared an attack. In November 1777, Congress appointed three commissioners to travel to Fort Pitt and investigate and report on the situation of the Western Department. Specifically, Congress directed the commissioners “to investigate the rise, progress, and extent of the disaffection in that quarter, and take measures for suppressing the same.” The commissioners also were directed “to cultivate the friendship of the Shawanese and Delawares, and prevent our people from committing any outrages against them” and also were “empowered to engage as many of the Delaware and Shawanese warriors in the service of the United States.” In coordination with General Edward Hand, the Continental Army Western Department commander at Fort Pitt, the commissioners also were authorized to devise a plan for “carrying the war into the enemy's country … to be extended against the British garrison at Detroit and its dependencies.” The commissioners included Colonel Samuel Washington (younger brother of George Washington) and Gabriel Jones, both from Virginia, and Colonel Joseph Reed from Pennsylvania. However, Reed declined the appointment and George Clymer was selected to take his place. Likewise, Washington and Jones also declined their appointments and so Governor Patrick Henry of Virginia appointed Sampson Mathews and Colonel Samuel McDowell to replace them. From Fort Pitt, the committee reported back to Congress the seriousness of the threat, recommending that 3,000 militiamen be sent to the western frontier.

As the commissioners were beginning their work at Fort Pitt in early 1778, Virginia also was taking steps to secure the western frontier. George Rogers Clark was commissioned a Lieutenant Colonel of the Illinois regiment of the Virginia State Forces with a plan to capture British held villages in the Illinois country and strike at Detroit. Clark organized his force in early 1778 at Redstone, a settlement on the Monongahela River south of Fort Pitt, and departed from there on May 12, 1778, proceeding on boats down the Monongahela to Fort Pitt where they picked up supplies before heading to the Falls of the Ohio. Clark was able to capture Kaskasia, Cahokia, and Vincennes in the Illinois country, but was not able to muster a force and march on Detroit. However, he was able to capture Hamilton in the winter of 1779 — a success that further encouraged the alliance with France that was forged after the American victory at Saratoga in the fall of 1777.

Later, during the Northwest Indian War, General Anthony Wayne built a fort adjacent to the site as Fort Lafayette, elided to Fort Fayette. Still later it was regarrisoned in the War of 1812 as a staging point and supply depot for expeditions against northern British forts. Both forts became part of the borough of Pittsburgh.

== 20th century ==
A view of the Fort Pitt Museum from Mount Washington; its structure is a recreation of a bastion of Ft. Pitt.

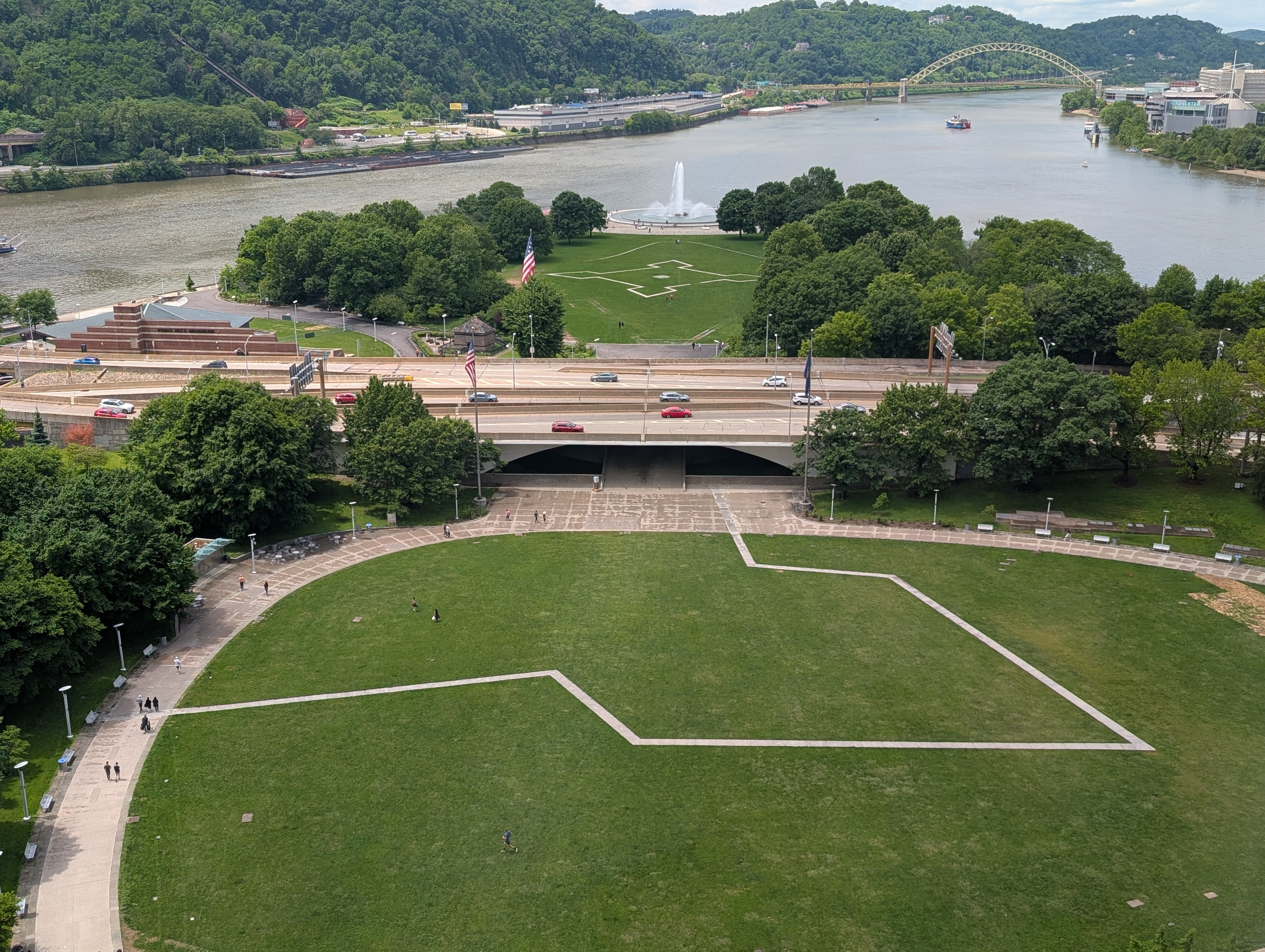
The outline of Fort Pitt in Point State Park in Pittsburgh as seen from above

In the 20th century, the city of Pittsburgh commissioned archeological excavation of the foundations of Fort Pitt. Afterward, some of the fort was reconstructed to give visitors at Point State Park a sense of the size of the fort. In this rebuilt section, the Fort Pitt Museum is housed in the Monongahela Bastion, and excavated portions of the fort were filled in.

A redoubt, a small brick outbuilding called the Blockhouse, survives in Point State Park as the sole remnant of Fort Pitt. Erected in 1764, it is believed to be the oldest building still standing in Pittsburgh. Used for many years as a private residence, the blockhouse was purchased and preserved for many years by the local chapter of the Daughters of the American Revolution.

Fort Pitt Foundry was an important armaments manufacturing center for the Federal government during the Civil War, under the charge of William Metcalf.

Archaeological investigations were undertaken on several occasions during the twentieth century, notably by James Swauger and in 2007 by A.D. Marble and Company. During the 2007 project features were encountered related to the construction and occupation of Fort Pitt from 1758 into the 1760s. The outline of the fort under construction was recorded on a sketch plan located at the Historical Society of Pennsylvania in the Indian Affairs Volume 3 of the Penn Papers. A measure of defense was provided by the "Stockado's for this Winter" (probably 1759-60), a palisade line across the Point to enclose the open western side of the unfinished fort.

Traces of an apparent palisade line were encountered in an electrical trench oriented northeast-southwest that passed west of the Blockhouse across the lower river terrace and onto the western end of the higher river terrace on which most of Fort Pitt would be erected. A disconnected series of seven rectangular holes was exposed in the trench, from north of the Blockhouse to the south. The features yielded redeposited prehistoric and/or early historic artifacts. The historic objects were consistent with deposition during construction around 1760 and included an English white salt-glazed stoneware sherd and one lead musket ball. Three features also had either creamware ceramic sherds dating no earlier than 1762 to 1770 or a pearlware sherd dating no earlier than 1785, objects that most likely reflect later disturbance when posts were replaced or removed.

A few of the features reflected a "post mold" or post outline upon removal. In one fortunate instance the lower portion of a post survived in the ground. The hand-hewn white oak base was approximately two feet in length with a rounded face and original bark covering on one side. The post had been extensively shaped by broadax cuts on the other faces and one such cut extended through the original bark. The post had a flat base, necessitating vertical placement in a pre-dug hole rather than being driven into the ground. The post base was conserved by Milner+Carr Conservation of Philadelphia.

The location of Fort Pitt straddled the higher (and geologically older) river terrace and lower terrace that formed during thousands of years of post-Pleistocene flooding. A spruce tree trunk (also conserved by Milner+Carr) measuring 18 feet in length and four feet in basal diameter was exposed in an irrigation trench that passed through the location of the Music (or northeast) Bastion of Fort Pitt. This bastion had extended from the higher onto the lower terrace and thus required a substantial deposition of fill to raise the grade of the lower terrace. A deposit of gray clay soil represented this fill placed behind the north wall of the Music Bastion in the fall of 1759 or winter of 1760 and the tree trunk was recovered from this fill soil. The use of timber for scaffolds and supports was integral to the construction of eighteenth-century forts; in late 1758 Henry Bouquet requested ship wrights be included among the skilled workers sent from Philadelphia to assist in the new fortifications.

Several underground magazines and store rooms were constructed beneath the ramparts and within the eastern bastion of the fort. An electrical trench east of the modern portal bridge extended across the "Store house for Flour&." marked F on the 1761 map by Bernard Ratzer. A sharpened round post four feet long (identified by Richard Lang) and a partially-shaped timber nearly eight feet long were dislodged by the electrical trench. The sharpened post most likely was placed vertically along the side walls of the store room; James Swauger exposed similar posts in the 1950s. The post and timber were conserved by Brian Howard Conservation of Carlisle, Pennsylvania.

== Popular culture ==
- The Allegheny Uprising (1939) starred John Wayne and Claire Trevor.
- In Cecil B. DeMille's Unconquered (1947), starring Gary Cooper and Paulette Goddard, Howard Da Silva played a gunrunner and Boris Karloff as the Seneca chief Guyasuta who lead an American Indian uprising in 1763. Cooper and Goddard save Fort Pitt.
- The video game Assassin's Creed III (2012) features Fort Pitt, but it is referred to as "Fort Duquesne", although some of the action takes place after the Braddock and Forbes expeditions, when Pitt had been built to replace Duquesne.
- Conrad Richter's youth novel, The Light in the Forest (1953), is partially set at Fort Pitt.
- Aerials of the fort can be seen during the opening credits of the 1993 film Groundhog Day as the live truck leaves the downtown area on its way to Punxsutawney.

== See also ==
- Great Britain in the Seven Years' War
- Redstone Old Fort
- Pennsylvania forts in the French and Indian War
