= Starting Point =

Starting Point may refer to:

- Starting Point (TV program), a television show on CNN in the United States
- Starting Point (film), a 2015 Polish short film
- A Starting Point, an American political website

== See also ==
- Start Point (disambiguation)
