= Manchester Bridge (Pittsburgh) =

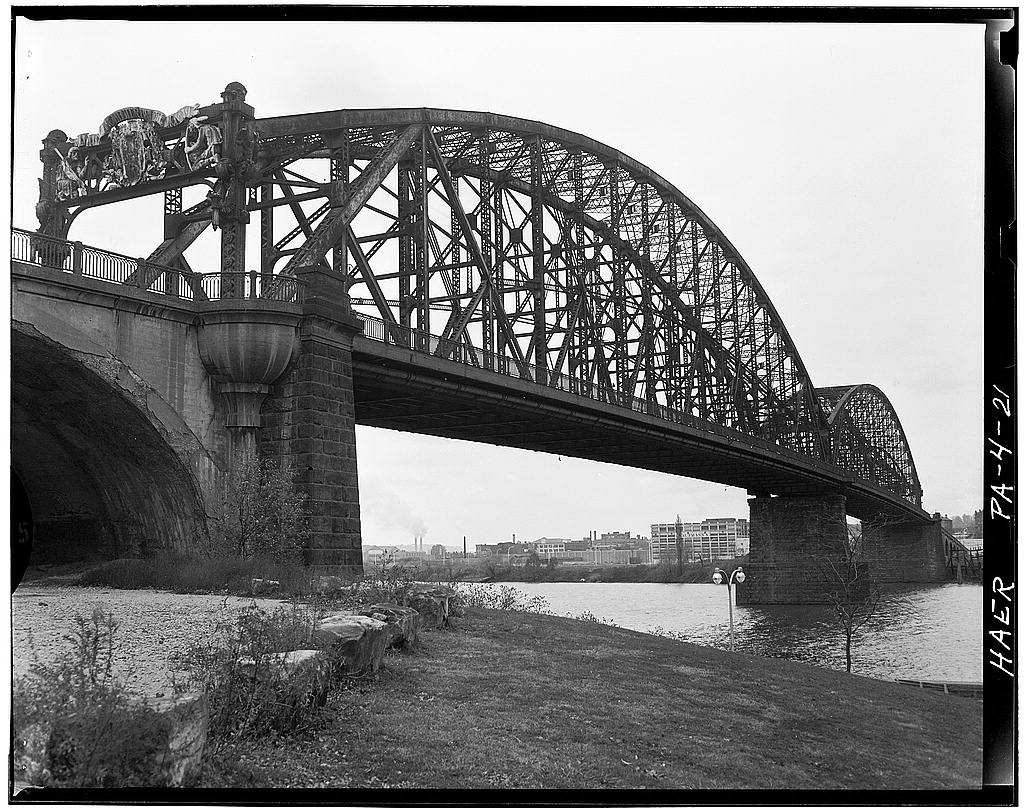
- Coordinates: 40.4435°N 80.0129°W
- Crossed: Allegheny River
- Locale: Pittsburgh, Pennsylvania
- Official name: North Side Point Bridge

Characteristics
- Design: subdivided Pratt through truss
- Material: Steel
- Total length: 2,840 feet (870 m)
- Longest span: 2 x 531 feet (162 m)
- Piers in water: 3
- Clearance below: 70 feet (21 m)

History
- Opened: August 8, 1915
- Closed: October 17, 1969
- Demolished: 1970

Location
- Interactive map of Manchester Bridge

The Manchester Bridge, also known as the North Side Point Bridge, was a steel Pratt truss bridge that spanned the Allegheny River in Pittsburgh, Pennsylvania.

== History ==
The Manchester Bridge became Pittsburgh's second bridge to span from the Point to the North Side. Its predecessor, the wooden covered Union Bridge, opened in 1874 and was demolished in 1907 after suffering extensive damage from a major flood that same year. The new bridge was constructed from 1911 to 1915. and was opened by Mayor Joseph G. Armstrong on August 8, 1915. It carried motorists across the Allegheny River for the next 54 years.

The bridge closed on October 17, 1969, when its successor, the Fort Duquesne Bridge (located closer to the Roberto Clemente Bridge) opened that same day as part of the city's Renaissance I redevelopment project. Efforts were made to save the old Manchester Bridge, but it was determined that it had to be removed (along with the adjoining Point Bridge, defunct since 1959 after the opening of the Fort Pitt Bridge) to complete construction of the new Point State Park. Explosives were used to drop the south span into the Allegheny River at 18:42 on September 29, 1970. The original attempt eleven hours earlier had been unsuccessful when five of the eight charges failed to detonate. Demolition was subcontracted to Controlled Demolition by Dravo Corporation and was overseen by John D. Loizeaux. Less than a month later on October 28, the north span was brought down the same way, this time with no problems.

Sculptor Charles Keck designed four figures for the bridge, representing Native American chief Guyasuta, pioneer Christopher Gist, a mill worker, and a coal miner. These were installed on the portals of the bridge in 1917. The two worker figures have also been identified as fictional heroes Joe Magarac and Jan Volkanik, despite some folklorists finding no evidence that the Magarac legend existed prior to 1931. The sculptures were salvaged from the bridge when it was razed in 1970 and, for a time, were displayed on the grounds of the Children's Museum of Pittsburgh. In a move funded by the Pittsburgh Steelers, the Guyasuta and Gist figures were moved to a display on Pittsburgh's North Shore in July 2016, and are now located near their original site.

A structural footing from the bridge still survives on the north bank of the Allegheny River, not far from the south end zone of Acrisure Stadium; it was cleaned and carved out as the setting for a memorial statue of Fred Rogers.

== See also ==
- Point Bridge (Pittsburgh)
- List of bridges documented by the Historic American Engineering Record in Pennsylvania
- List of crossings of the Allegheny River

== Gallery ==
Fred Rogers memorial statue, north bank footing, Manchester Bridge
