= Midpoint (disambiguation) =

A midpoint is the middle point of a line segment in geometry.

Midpoint may also refer to:

- Midpoint (astrology)
- Midpoint (company)
- Midpoint (screenwriting)
- Midpoint (album), a 2022 album by Tom Chaplin
- Midpoint Café, a restaurant, souvenir and antique shop on US Route 66 in Adrian, Texas
- Midpoint Memorial Bridge, connects Fort Myers and Cape Cora in Florida
- Midpoint method, in numerical analysis
- MidPoint Music Festival, held in Cincinnati, Ohio
- Midpoint Trade Books, book sales, distribution, and marketing company founded in 1996

== See also ==
- Start Point (disambiguation)
- Endpoint (disambiguation)
- Bullet (typography) (•) and interpunct ( · ) are both occasionally known as "mid point" or "mid dot".
