= Point Bridge (Pittsburgh) =

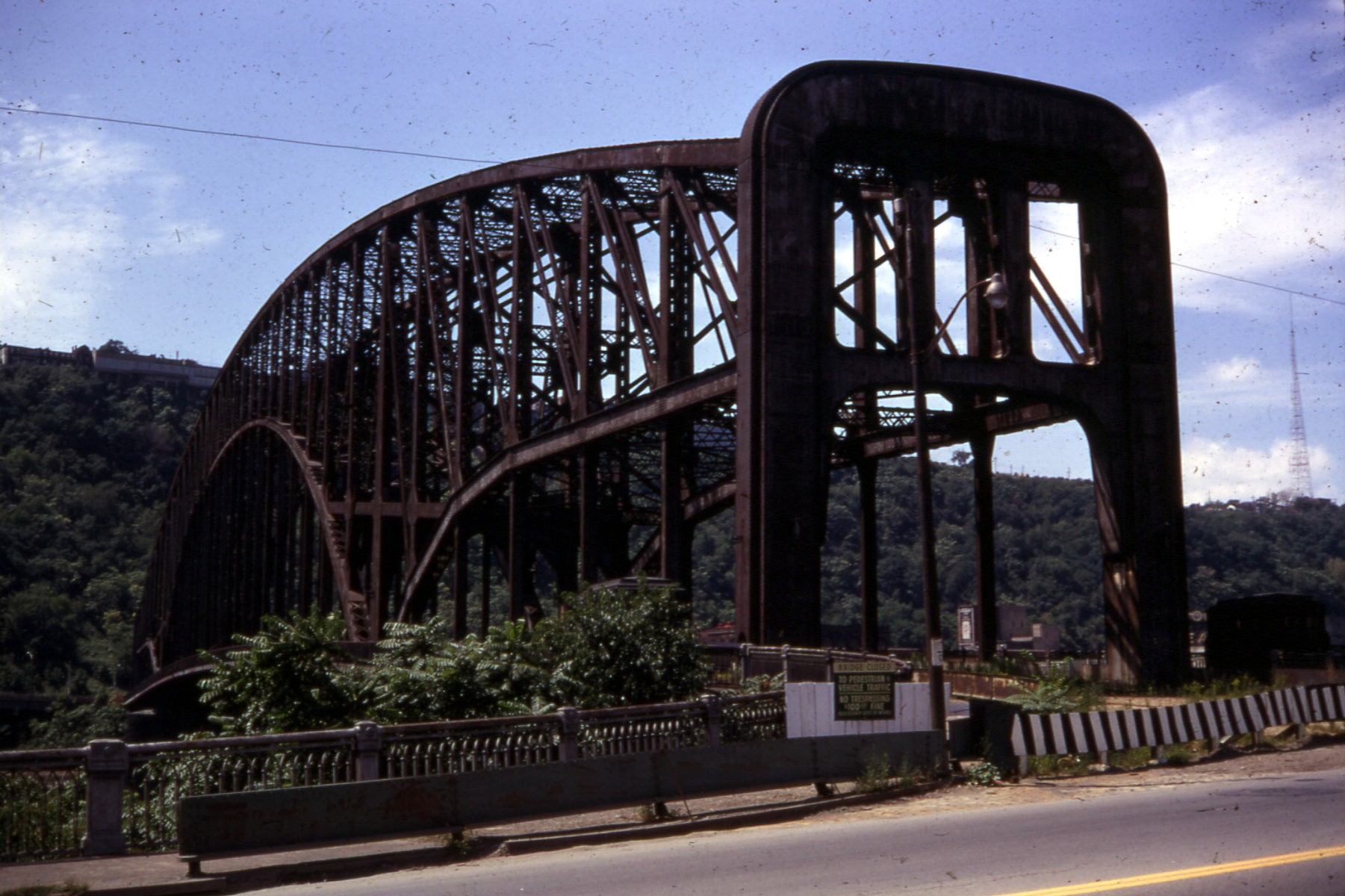
- Point Bridge at Fort Pitt Boulevard in 1968, eight years after it closed and two years before it was demolished
- Coordinates: 40.4408°N 80.0145°W
- Crosses: Monongahela River
- Locale: Pittsburgh, Pennsylvania
- Official name: South Side Point Bridge

Characteristics
- Design: cantilever through truss
- Material: Steel
- Total length: 1,120 feet (340 m)
- Width: 38 feet (12 m)
- Longest span: 670 feet (200 m)
- Piers in water: 2
- Clearance below: 60 feet (18 m)

History
- Opened: June 20, 1927
- Closed: June 21, 1959

Location
- Interactive map of Point Bridge

The Point Bridge was a steel cantilever truss bridge that spanned the Monongahela River in Pittsburgh, Pennsylvania.

== History ==
=== Point Bridge I ===
In 1877, a suspension bridge called the Point Bridge was built over the Monongahela River; it has been retroactively referred to as Point Bridge I by locals since being replaced by the second Point Bridge that is sometimes called "Point Bridge II."

=== Point Bridge II ===
The bridge was constructed from 1925 to 1927 and was opened to traffic on 20 June 1927. Dismantling of the old Point Bridge began that following August, and on October 9 the span was brought down into the Monongahela River by cutting the last cables holding it in place.

The new Point Bridge was constructed by the Fort Pitt Bridge Works of Canonsburg, Pennsylvania and was situated closer to the point than its Allegheny River counterpart, the Manchester Bridge. Its north end landed roughly where the plaza around the Point State Park fountain begins, and its south end landed less than a tenth of a mile east of the Duquesne Incline. The bridge passed over an elevated span above the Point to connect the two bridges.

The Point Bridge II was closed to traffic on June 21, 1959, two days after the dedication and grand opening of the Fort Pitt Bridge. It remained standing until demolition began on April 15, 1970, and was completed that following November. The south landing remains, partly shrouded by trees, between West Station Square Drive and West Carson Street.

In 2008, a headstone marking the duration of the bridge's construction was found abandoned on the hillside across from the old south landing; it is now on display at nearby Station Square.

== See also ==
- Manchester Bridge (Pittsburgh)
- Fort Pitt Bridge
- List of bridges documented by the Historic American Engineering Record in Pennsylvania
- List of crossings of the Monongahela River

== Gallery ==
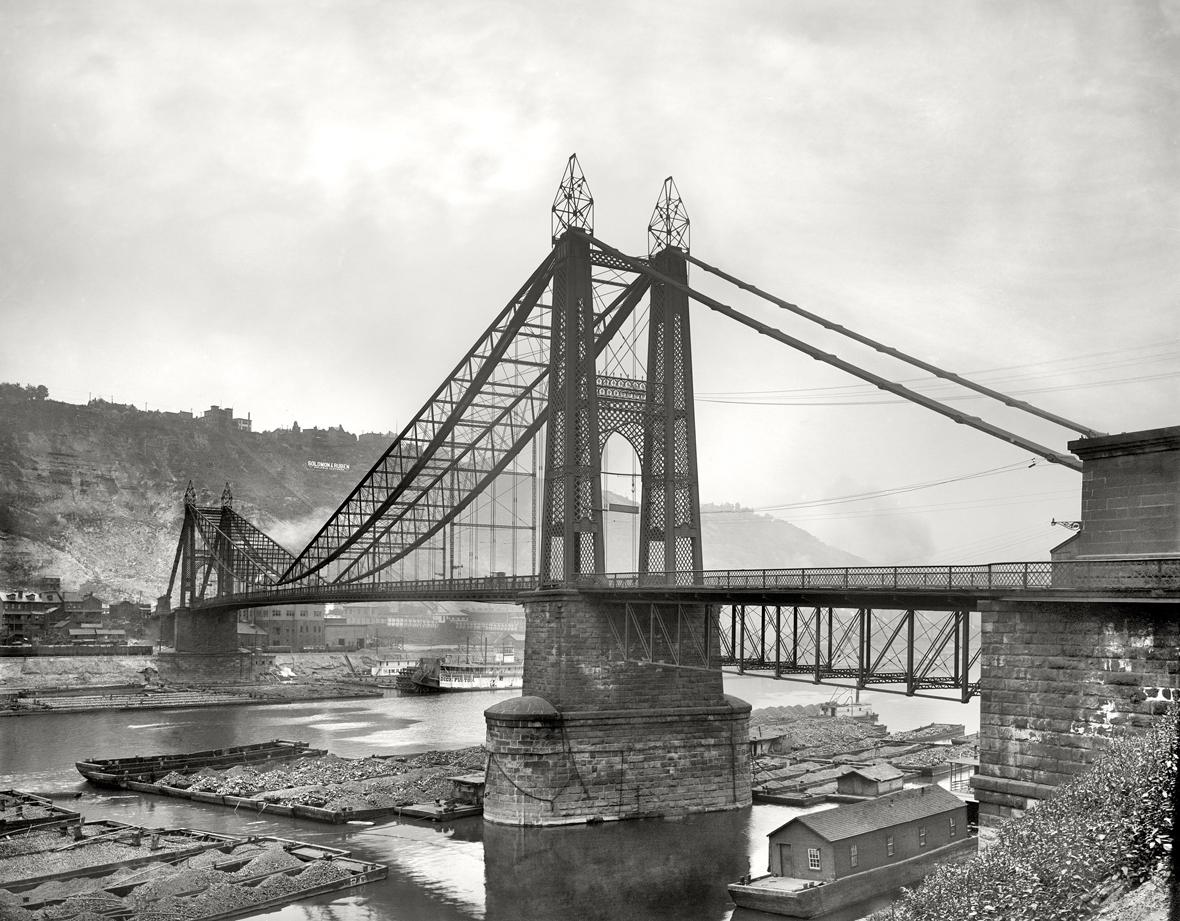
Original Point Bridge

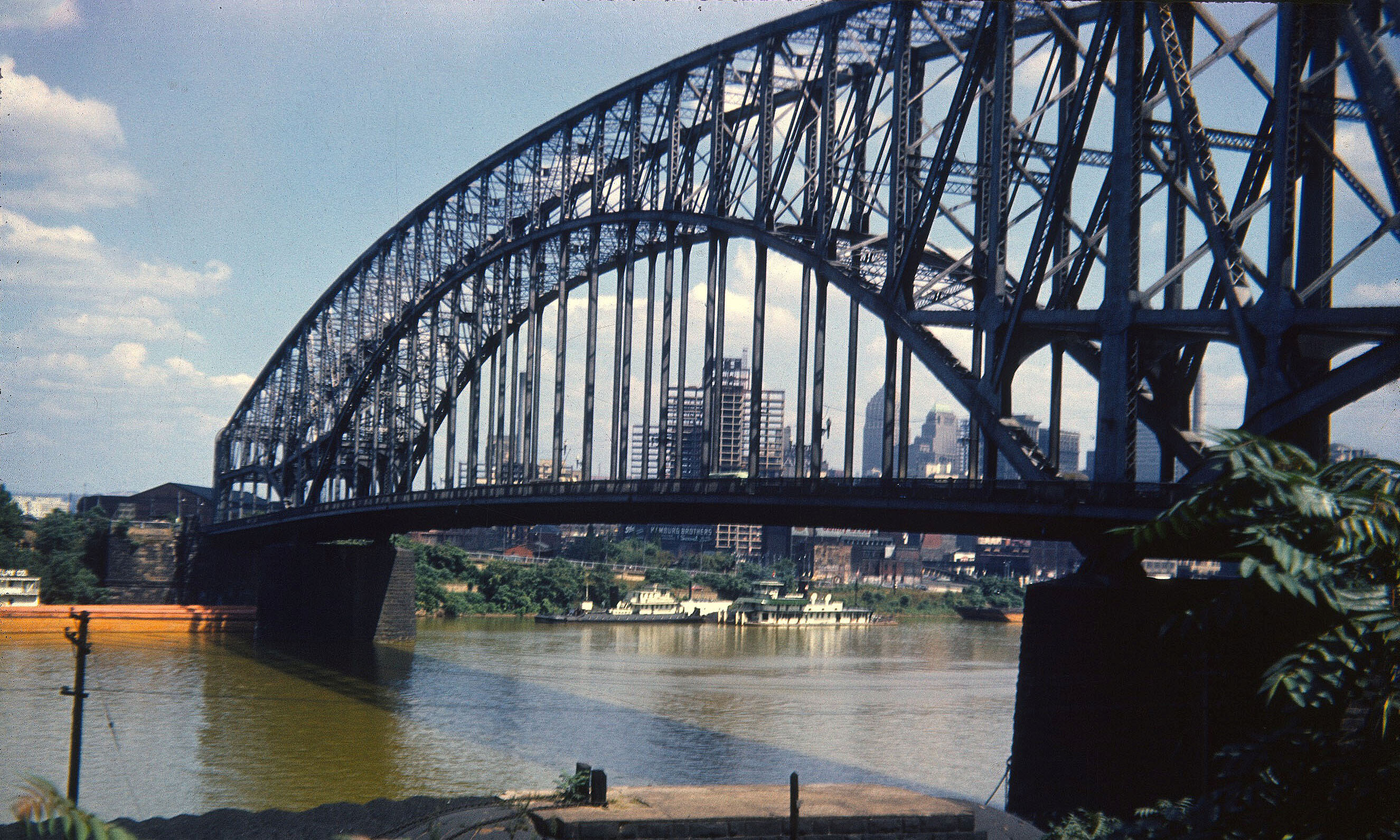
Pittsburgh Point Bridge II, looking north across the Monongahela River, 1951
