= Fort Pitt Block House =

Redoubt in Pittsburgh, Pennsylvania

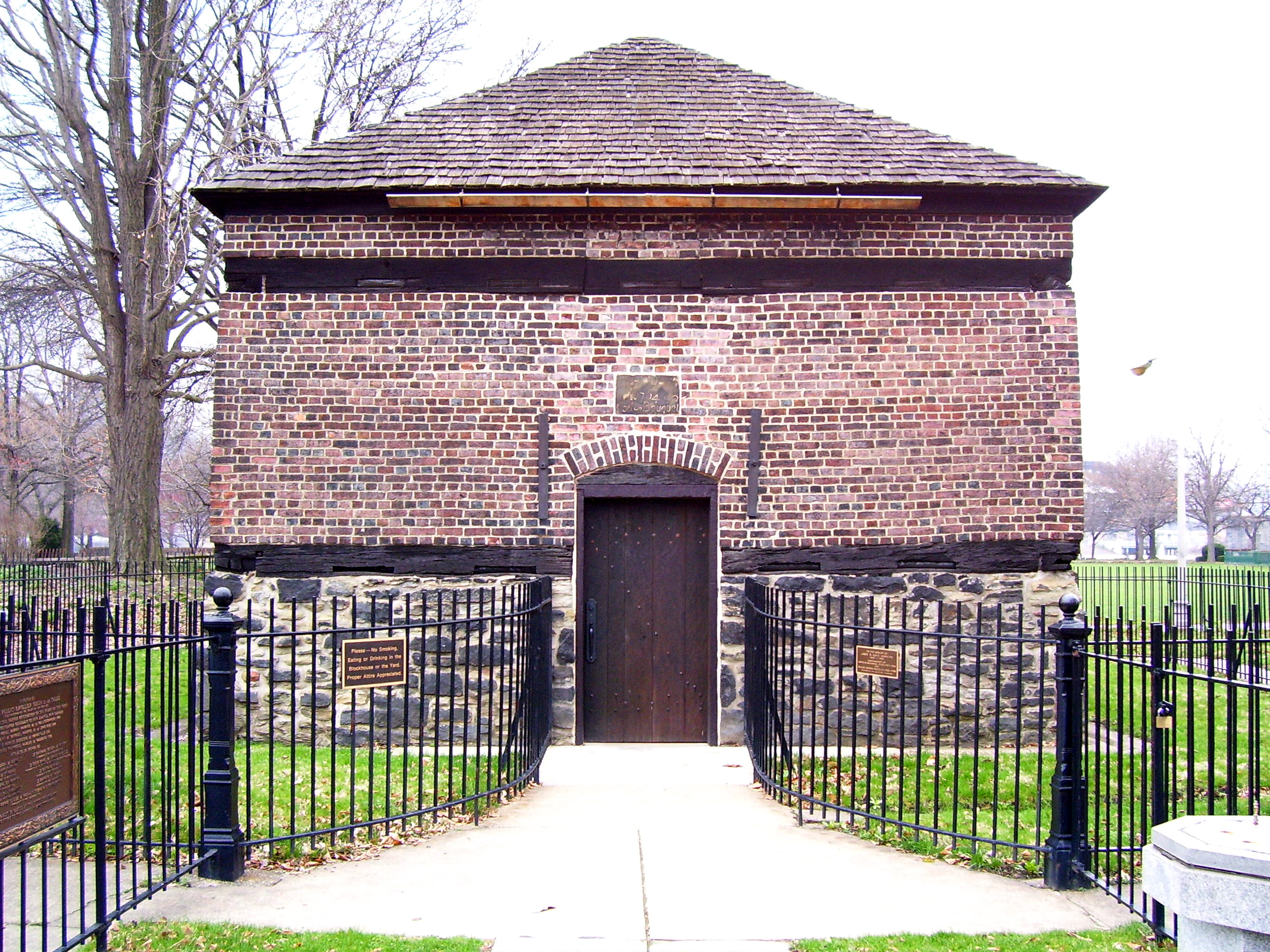
- Former names: Bouquet's Block House; Bouquet's Redoubt; Old Block House

General information
- Type: Redoubt
- Location: Point State Park, Pittsburgh
- Coordinates: 40°26′28″N 80°00′35″W
- Completed: 1764

Technical details
- Floor count: 2
- Forks of the Ohio
- U.S. Historic district – Contributing property
- U.S. National Historic Landmark District – Contributing property
- Pennsylvania state historical marker
- Pittsburgh Landmark – PHLF
- Part of: Point State Park (ID66000643)

Significant dates
- Designated CP: October 15, 1966
- Designated NHLDCP: October 9, 1960
- Designated PHMC: May 8, 1959
- Designated PHLF: unknown

The Fort Pitt Block House (sometimes called Bouquet's Blockhouse or Bouquet's Redoubt) is a historic building in Point State Park in the city of Pittsburgh. It was constructed in 1764 as a redoubt of Fort Pitt, making it the oldest extant structure in Western Pennsylvania, as well as the "oldest authenticated structure west of the Allegheny Mountains".

The structure has never been torn down, completely rebuilt, or moved during its centuries of existence. Much of its timbers, brick, and stone remain original to its 1764 construction.

== History ==
The Block House was constructed in 1764 as a defensive military redoubt. Henry Bouquet initiated the construction of a small number of redoubts around the outer walls of the fort as a way to reinforce its defense, (Note: . The specific number of redoubts constructed is variously listed as two (Toker 2007) or five (Toker 2009)) of which only the Fort Pitt Block House survives.

The structure had been converted into a private house in 1785 by Isaac Craig. When Fort Pitt was demolished in 1792, the Block House was left untouched because it was in use as a residence.

In 1894, philanthropist Mary Schenley presented the deed to the Block House to the Daughters of the American Revolution (DAR). She did this specifically so that the structure might be preserved for future generations:

You are to preserve and keep this relic of a bygone past, and to gather and preserve all obtainable history and tradition in regard to it, and you are to beautify and adorn it and to make it the receptacle of relics bearing on the Colonial and Revolutionary periods of its existence....I will therefore...leave the ladies of your Society, who have the history of western Pennsylvania at their finger ends, to tell the story of the chivalrous Frenchmen, cruel, crafty Indians, courageous British, and intrepid Colonists. It is fitting that this old landmark, rich in historic associations of more than a century ago, should fall into the hands of those who by birth, tradition, and sentiment are particularly fitted to receive and preserve it and perpetuate the memories of the days when it was occupied by the French and their Indian allies, and afterwards by the British and Colonial troops.

(However, the French had already abandoned control of the area when the blockhouse was built in 1764.)

Industrialist Henry Clay Frick purchased all of the land surrounding the Block House in 1902, shortly before Schenley's death. He offered the DAR $25,000 to move the Block House to Schenley Park; however, the DAR refused. Following lengthy litigation, the Supreme Court of Pennsylvania ruled in favor of the DAR and the Block House, enabling its continued preservation.

== Current status ==
Although the Block House resides within the boundaries of Point State Park, it is owned and operated by the Fort Pitt Society of the Daughters of the American Revolution. The DAR allows visitors to the park to tour the structure. The building is recognized by the National Register of Historic Places as being the sole surviving historical building in the "Forks of the Ohio (Site of Fort Duquesne and Fort Pitt, Bouquet's Blockhouse)" historic place. It also has a historical marker issued by the commonwealth of Pennsylvania and is a Pittsburgh History & Landmarks Foundation designated Historic Landmark.

== Maps and illustrations ==
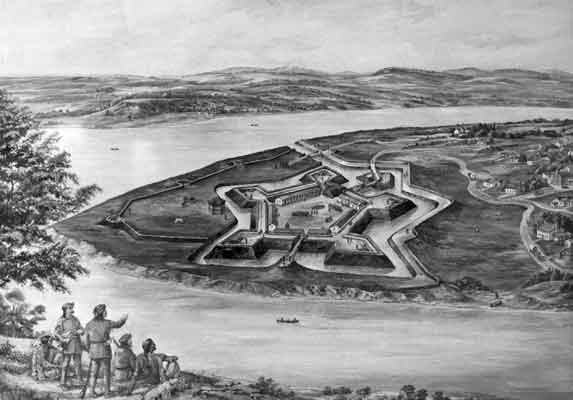
1776: The Block House is visible to the left of the fort's wall.

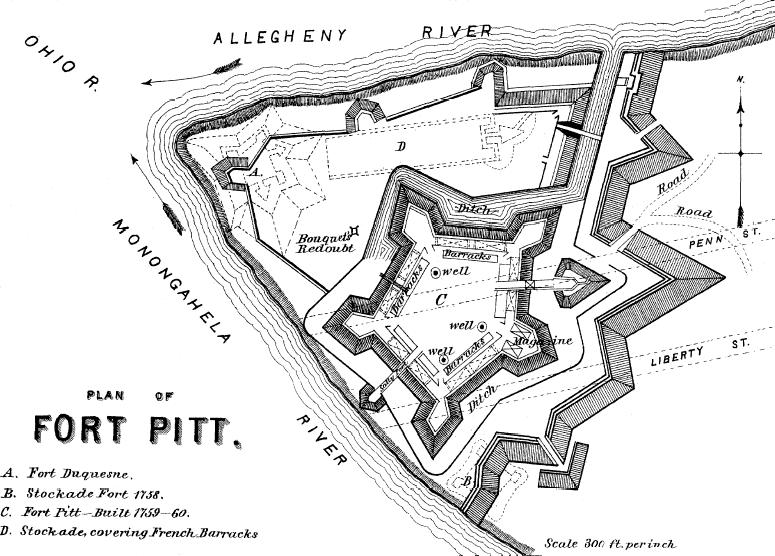
1795: The Block House is labeled as "Bouquet's Redoubt".

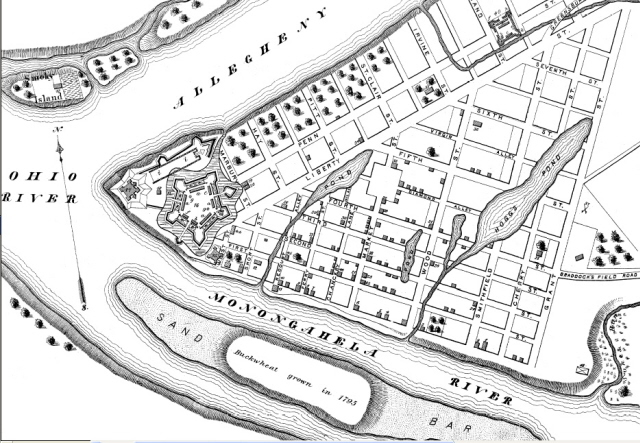
1795: The Block House is visible to the left of the fort's wall.

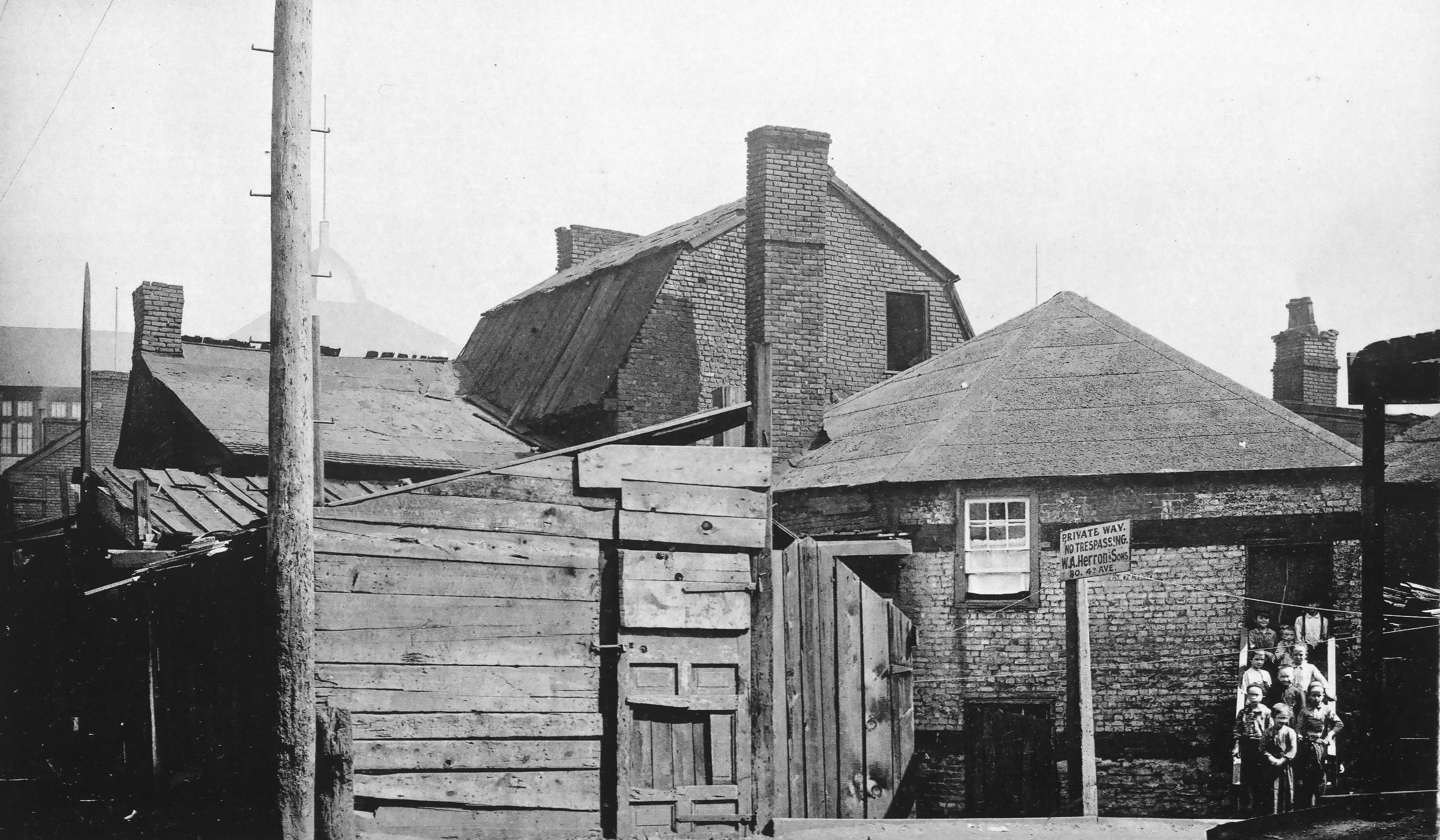
c. 1893: The Block House being used as a house

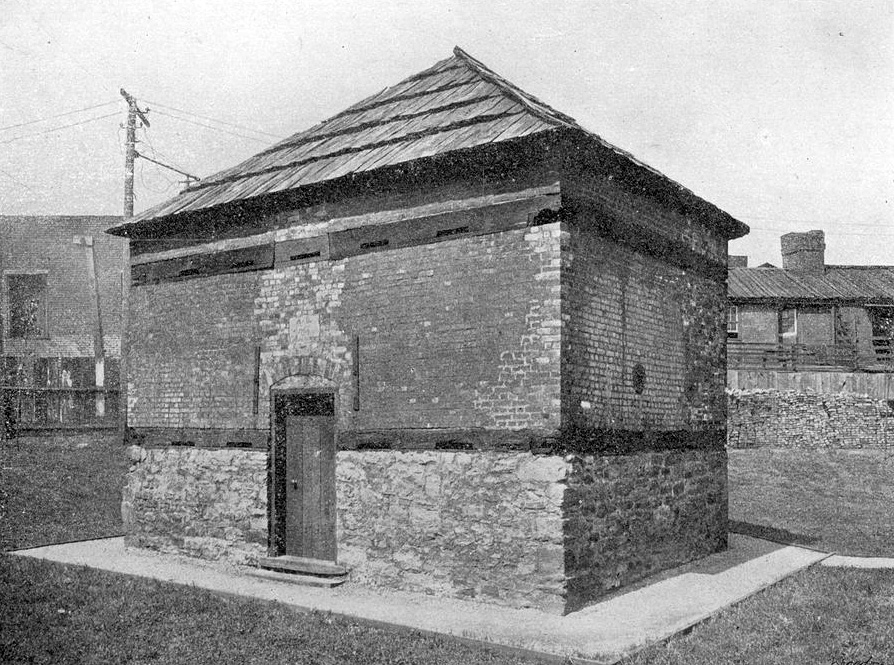
c. 1903: The Block House around the time it was given to the DAR

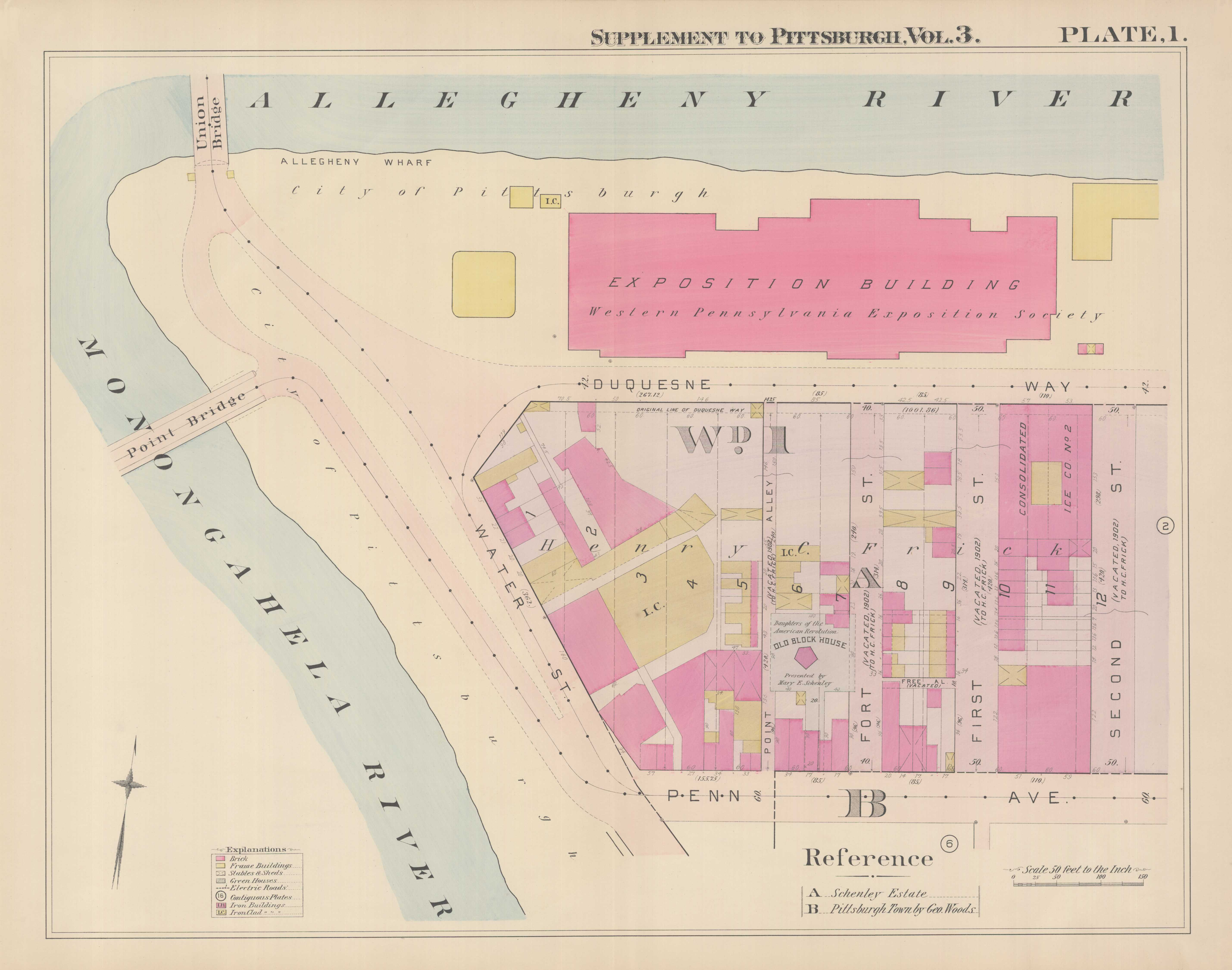
1900: A map of the Forks of the Ohio. The Block House is surrounded by other structures and listed on the map as being owned by the DAR and "presented by Mary Schenley".
