= The Points =

The Point may refer to:

- "The Points" (song), a rap song
- The Points (website), a news website

== See also ==
- The Point
