= Point system (nautical) =

Form of relative bearing

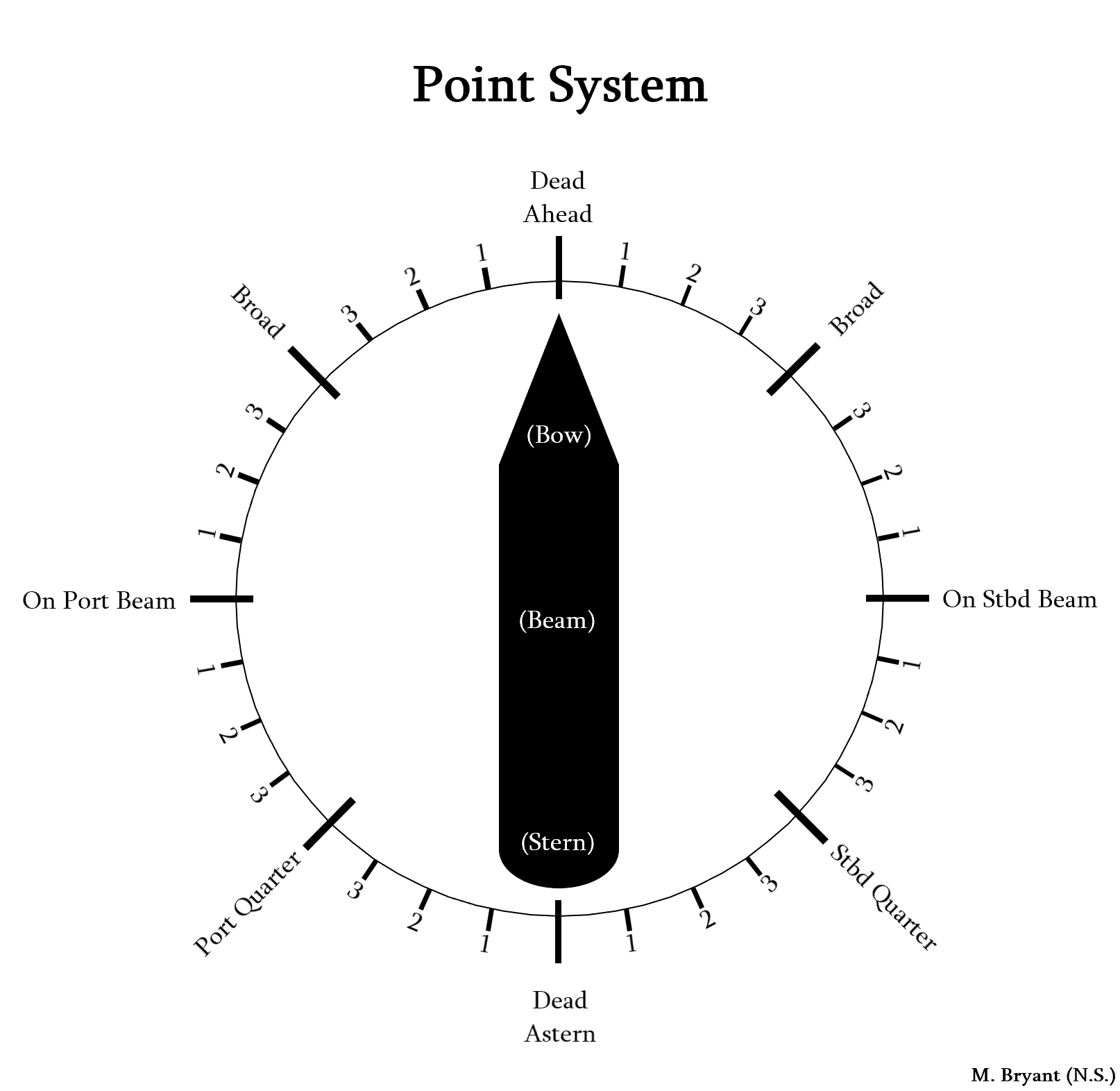
Each of the 32 points is labelled relative to sections on a ship.

The point system is a common way of identifying the location of contacts relative to the heading of a ship. It is a form of relative bearing. The point system uses 32 evenly spaced imaginary points that circle the ship starting at the forward bow. Individual points sit at intervals of 11.25°, similar to compass bearings. The lookout, when having sighted something beyond the ship, will call out the object's location by stating its position relative to the bow, stern, or beam of the ship, noting whether on the port or starboard side when applicable.

== Use of the point system ==
Objects are located by assigning them a point relative to the bow, stern, or beam, up to three points off of each respectively. Each point acts a stand-in for a corresponding degree from 0 to 360, as seen on a compass. For example, an object sighted at 67.5° would be called out as "two points forward of the starboard beam." An object sighted at 337.5° would be called out as "2 points off the port bow."

Additionally, a special designation is given to objects that sit four points ahead of the beam, being referred to as broad on the port/starboard bow. Congruently, the fourth point aft of the beam is on the port/starboard quarter. "Broad" and "on the quarter" are never to be used as references for any other points as the bow, stern, and beam are used. It would be incorrect for a lookout to refer to an object as "2 points aft of the port quarter." Such an object would be referred to as "2 points off the port stern." Additionally, an object sighted directly ahead of the ship is called out as dead ahead. One directly astern is called dead astern. Any item directly on the beam is called out as on the port/starboard beam. Sometimes one point off the starboard or port bow is classified as fine to port/starboard, but this is not universal.

The point system is most commonly used on board merchant ships and recreational sailing vessels. Naval ships instead tend to use relative bearings by degrees port or starboard of dead ahead.

== See also ==
- Relative bearing
- Cardinal direction
