= Point (surname) =

Point is a French surname. Notable people with the surname include:

- Brayden Point (born 1996), Canadian ice hockey player
- Christophe Point (born 1965), French footballer
- Colton Point (born 1998), Canadian ice hockey player
- Craig Point (born 1986), Canadian lacrosse player
- Mittie Frances Clarke Point (1850–1937), American writer
- Steven Point (born 1951), Canadian judge
- Susan Point (born 1952), Canadian artist

== See also ==
- Jason LaPoint (born 1977), American racing driver
