= Endpoint =

An endpoint, end-point or end point may refer to:

- Endpoint (band), a hardcore punk band from Louisville, Kentucky
- Endpoint (chemistry), the conclusion of a chemical reaction, particularly for titration
- Outcome measure, a measure used as an endpoint in research
- Clinical endpoint, in clinical research, a disease, symptom, or sign that constitutes one of the target outcomes of the trial or its participants

== In mathematics ==
- Endpoint, the lower or upper bound of an interval (mathematics)
- Endpoint, either of the two nodes of an edge in a graph
- Endpoint, either of two extreme points on a line segment
- Endpoint, either of two extreme points on a curve segment

== In computing ==
- Communication endpoint, the entity on one end of a transport layer connection
- Endpoint (web API), a function or procedure call that is part of an API in software engineering
- Endpoint security, the security model around end user devices such as PCs, laptops and mobile phones

== See also ==
- Enden Point, in Antarctica
