= Point State Park =

Park in Pittsburgh, Pennsylvania

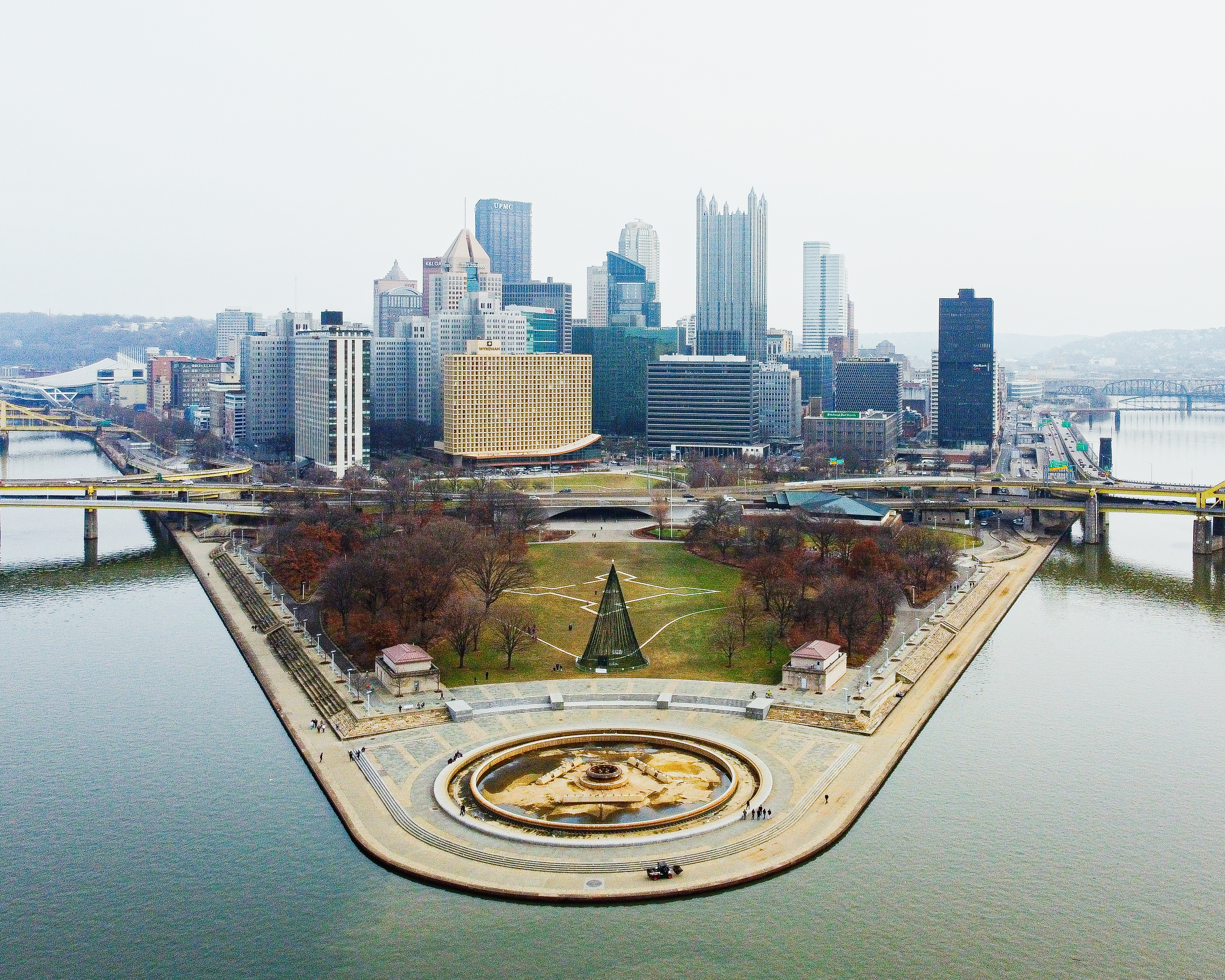
- Point State Park in 2019

- Location within Pennsylvania Location within the United States
- Interactive map of Point State Park
- Location: Pittsburgh, Pennsylvania, United States
- Coordinates: 40°26′30″N 80°00′26″W
- Area: 36 acres (15 ha)
- Elevation: 718 feet (219 m)
- Established: August 1974
- Administrator: Pennsylvania Department of Conservation and Natural Resources
- Website: Official website
- Pennsylvania State Parks
- Forks of the Ohio
- U.S. National Register of Historic Places
- U.S. National Historic Landmark
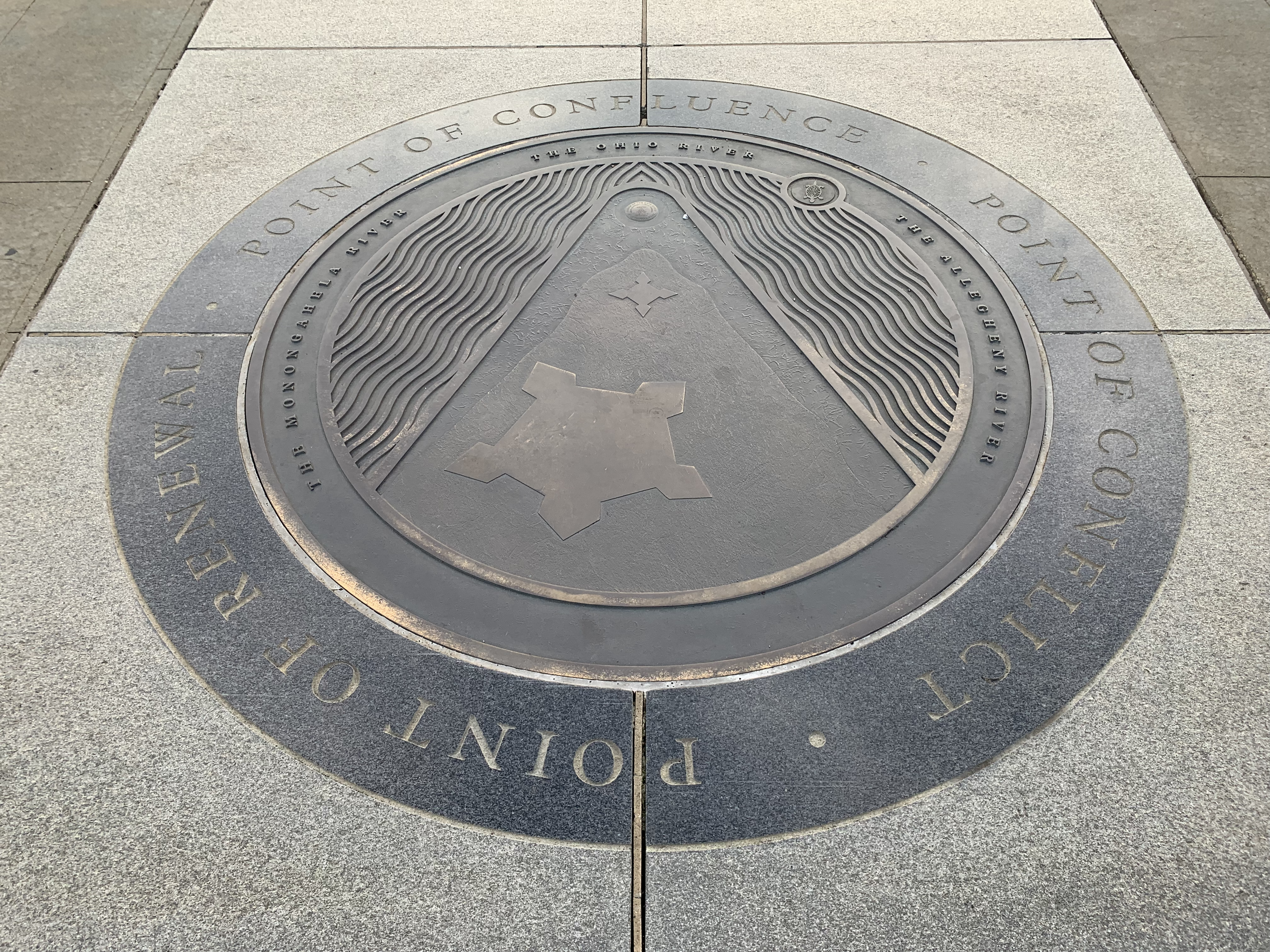
- Marker denoting the point of confluence
- NRHP reference No.: 66000643

Significant dates
- Added to NRHP: October 15, 1966
- Designated NHL: October 9, 1960

Point State Park (locally known as The Point) is a Pennsylvania state park which is located on 36 acres (150,000 m^{2}) in Downtown Pittsburgh, Allegheny County, Pennsylvania, U.S., at the confluence of the Allegheny and Monongahela rivers, forming the Ohio River.

Built on land that was acquired via eminent domain from industrial enterprises during the 1950s, the park opened in August 1974 after construction was completed on its iconic fountain. Pittsburgh settled on the current design after rejecting an alternative plan for a Point Park Civic Center designed by Frank Lloyd Wright.

The park also includes the outlines and remains of two of the oldest structures in Pittsburgh, Fort Pitt and Fort Duquesne. The Fort Pitt Museum, which is housed in the Monongahela Bastion of Fort Pitt, commemorates the French and Indian War (1754–63), during which the area soon to become Pittsburgh became a major battlefield. It was designated as a National Historic Landmark in 1960 for its role in the strategic struggles between Native Americans, French colonists, and British colonists for control of the Ohio River watershed.

== Features ==
Today, the park provides recreational space for workers, visitors, and residents in downtown Pittsburgh, and also acts as the site for major cultural events in the city, including the Venture Outdoors Festival, Three Rivers Arts Festival and Three Rivers Regatta. The park is operated by the Pennsylvania Bureau of State Parks.

=== Fountain ===
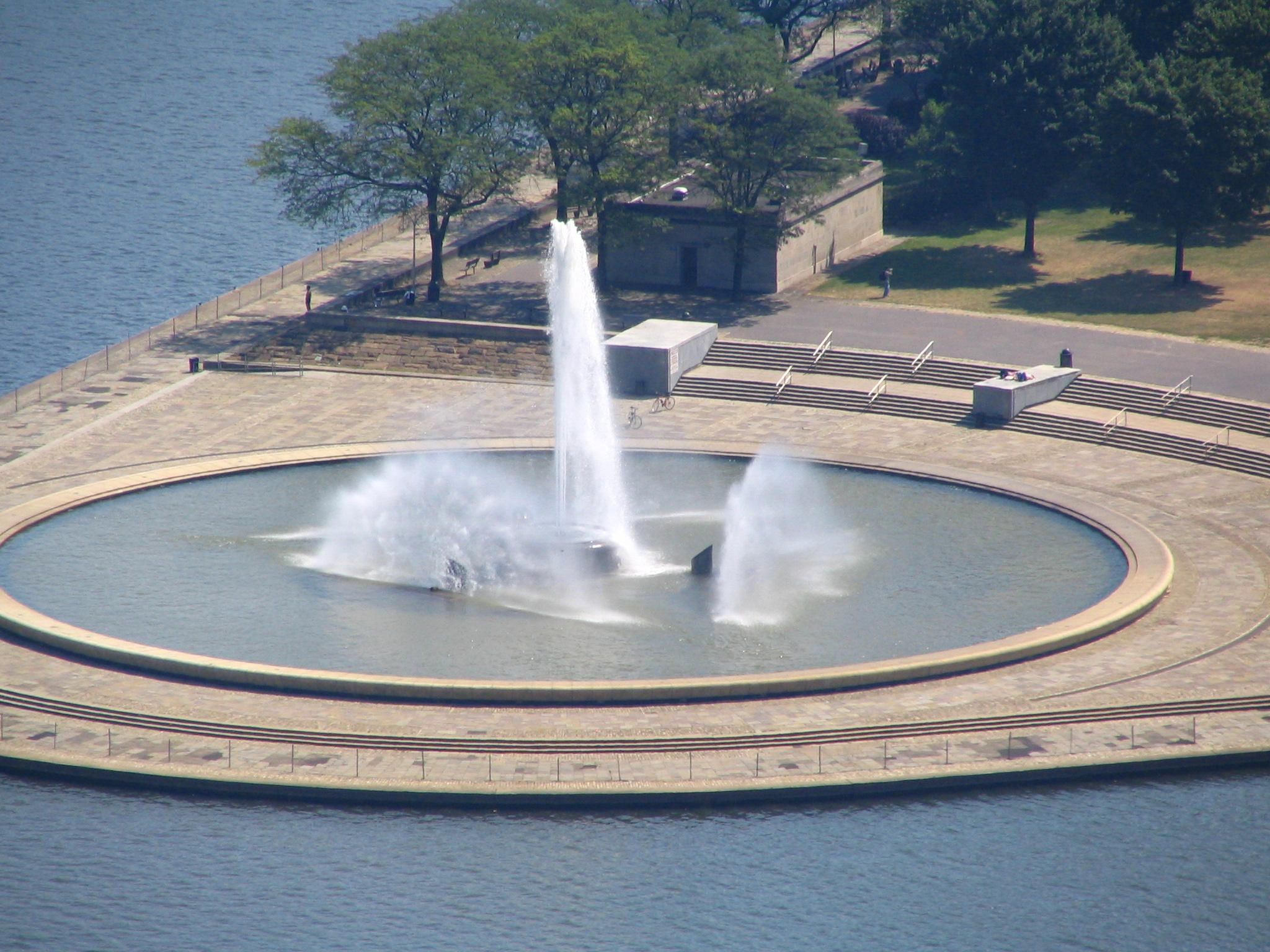
The fountain in Point State Park, which sprays water up to 150 feet (46 m) in the air at the head of the Ohio River.

The location of the fountain at the tip of the Point previously served as a connector for two old bridges, the Manchester Bridge (over the Allegheny River) and Point Bridge (over the Monongahela). Both were removed in 1970 to make way for the fountain.

In April 2009, the fountain was turned off for a $9.6 million upgrade and refurbishment; it went online again at the opening of the Three Rivers Arts Festival on June 7, 2013.

The fountain also serves as the western terminus for the Great Allegheny Passage, a 150-mile hiker-biker trail beginning at the 184.5 milepost of the Cumberland, MD, terminus of the Chesapeake & Ohio Canal National Historical Park, which begins in the Georgetown area of Washington, DC, thus forming in total a 350-mile recreational trail between DC and Pittsburgh.

== History ==
=== 18th century ===
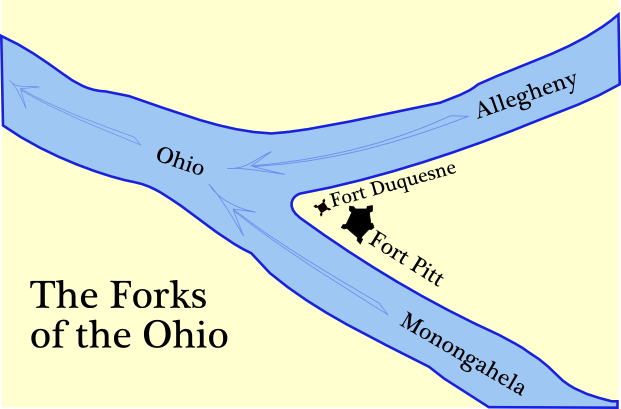
Period map showing strategic location of 18th century forts at Forks of the Ohio

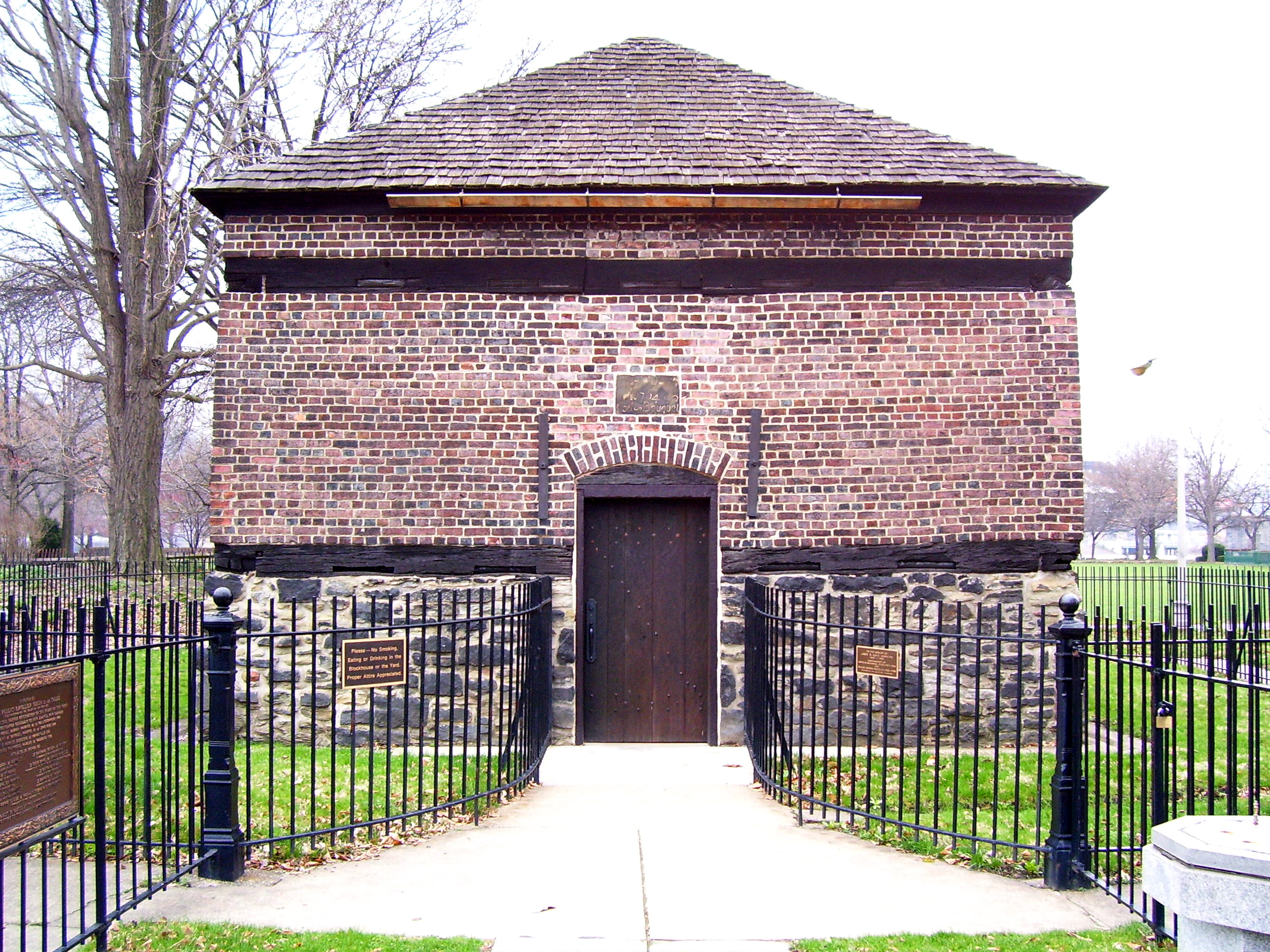
The Fort Pitt Blockhouse

The confluence of the Allegheny and Monongahela rivers, creating the Ohio River, has greatly impacted the history of Point State Park. This confluence was referred to as the Forks of the Ohio, which remains the official landmark-designated name for the site. It was once at the center of river travel, trade, and even wars throughout the pioneer history of Western Pennsylvania. During the mid-18th century, the armies of France and the Great Britain carved paths through the wilderness to control the point area and trade on the rivers. The French built Fort Duquesne in 1754 on foundations of Fort Prince George, which had been built by the colonial forces of Virginia.

The French held Fort Duquesne during the French and Indian War, and it became one of the focal points for that war because of its strategic riverside location in disputed territory. The French held the fort successfully early in the war, turning back the 1755 expedition led by General Edward Braddock. A smaller attack by James Grant in September 1758 was repulsed, but with heavy losses. Two months later, on November 25, the Forbes Expedition, under General John Forbes, captured the site after the French destroyed Fort Duquesne the day before. The British built the temporary Mercer's Fort in 1759, and later a much larger fort on the site, Fort Pitt.

The Forbes Expedition was successful where the Braddock expedition had failed because of the Treaty of Easton, in which local American Indians agreed to abandon their alliance with the French. American Indians, primarily Delawares and Shawnee, made this agreement with the understanding that the British military would leave the area after the war. The Indians did not want British army garrisons in their territory. The British, however, built Fort Pitt on the site, naming it after William Pitt the Elder.

As a result, in 1763 local Delawares and Shawnees took part in Pontiac's Rebellion, an effort to drive the British from the region. The Indians' siege of Fort Pitt began on June 22, 1763, but the fort was too strong to be taken by force. During a diplomatic meeting at the fort, the commander of Fort Pitt Simon Ecuyer gave Delaware Indian emissaries blankets that had been exposed to smallpox in hopes of infecting them, as suggested by trader William Trent. The use of blankets to spread smallpox was discussed and approved the next month between British General Jeffery Amherst and his subordinate Colonel Henry Bouquet, who was marching to Fort Pitt with a force of 460 soldiers. Smallpox was highly contagious among the Native Americans, and — together with measles, influenza, chicken pox, and other Old World diseases — was a major cause of death since the arrival of Europeans and their animals. A reported outbreak that began the spring before left as many as one hundred Native Americans dead in Ohio Country from 1763 to 1764. It is not clear, however, whether the smallpox was a result of the Fort Pitt incident or the virus was already present among the Delaware people as outbreaks happened on their own every dozen or so years and the delegates were met again later and they seemingly had not contracted smallpox. On August 1, 1763, most of the Indians broke off the siege to intercept an approaching force under Colonel Bouquet, resulting in the Battle of Bushy Run. Bouquet fought off the attack and relieved Fort Pitt on August 20.

After Pontiac's War, Fort Pitt was no longer necessary to the British Crown, and was abandoned to the locals in 1772. At that time, the Pittsburgh area was claimed by both Virginia and Pennsylvania, and a power struggle for the region commenced. Virginians took control of Fort Pitt, and for a brief while in the 1770s it was called Fort Dunmore, in honour of Virginia's Governor Lord Dunmore. The fort was a staging ground in Dunmore's War of 1774.

During the American Revolutionary War, Fort Pitt was the headquarters for the western theatre of the war.

A small brick building called the Blockhouse—actually an outbuilding known as a redoubt—remains in Point State Park, the only intact remnant of Fort Pitt. It was erected in 1764, and is believed to be the oldest building, not only in Pittsburgh, but in Western Pennsylvania. Used for many years as a house, the blockhouse was purchased and has been preserved for many years by the Daughters of the American Revolution, who open it to the public.

=== Early 20th century ===
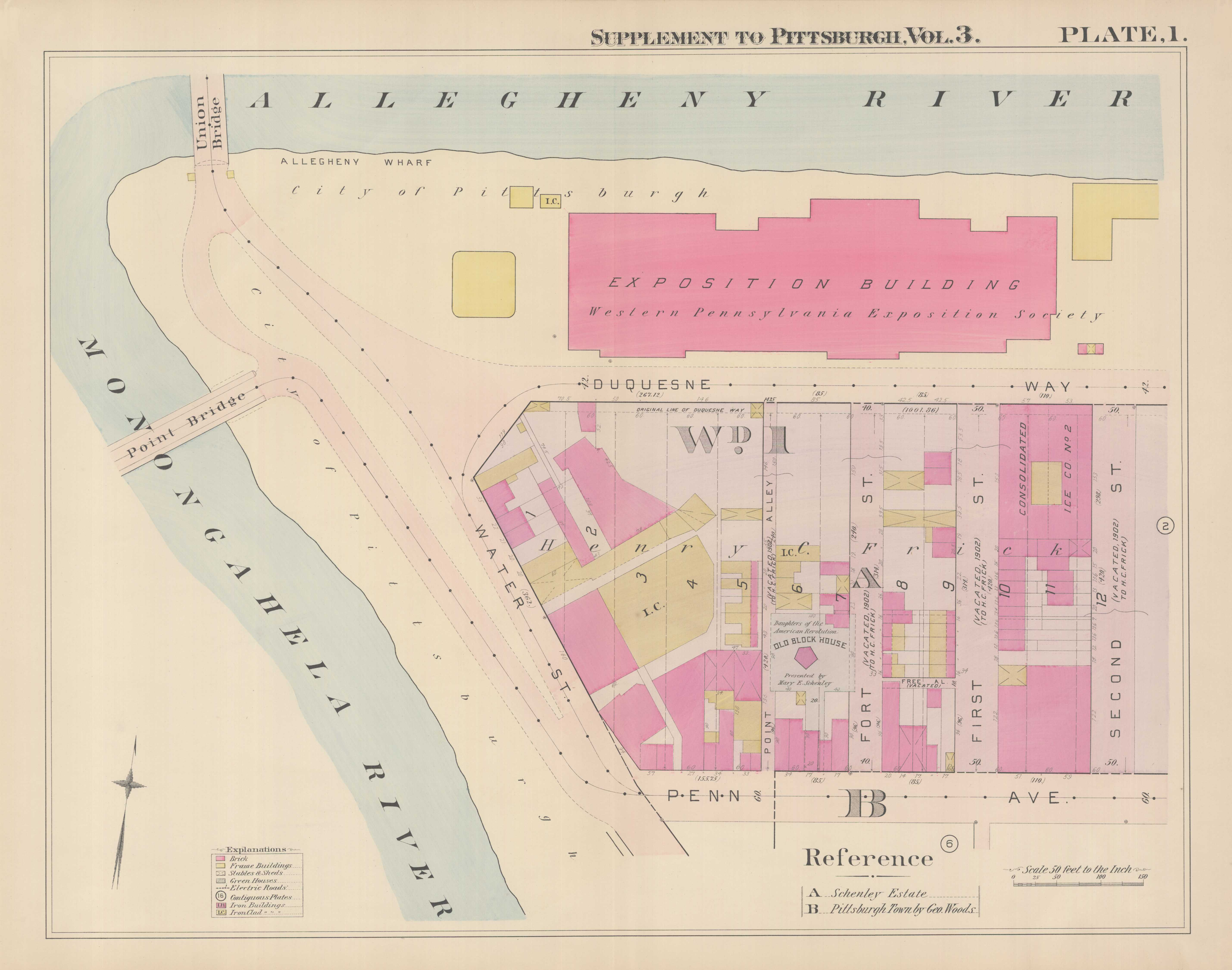
This map from 1900 demonstrates how densely developed the site became.

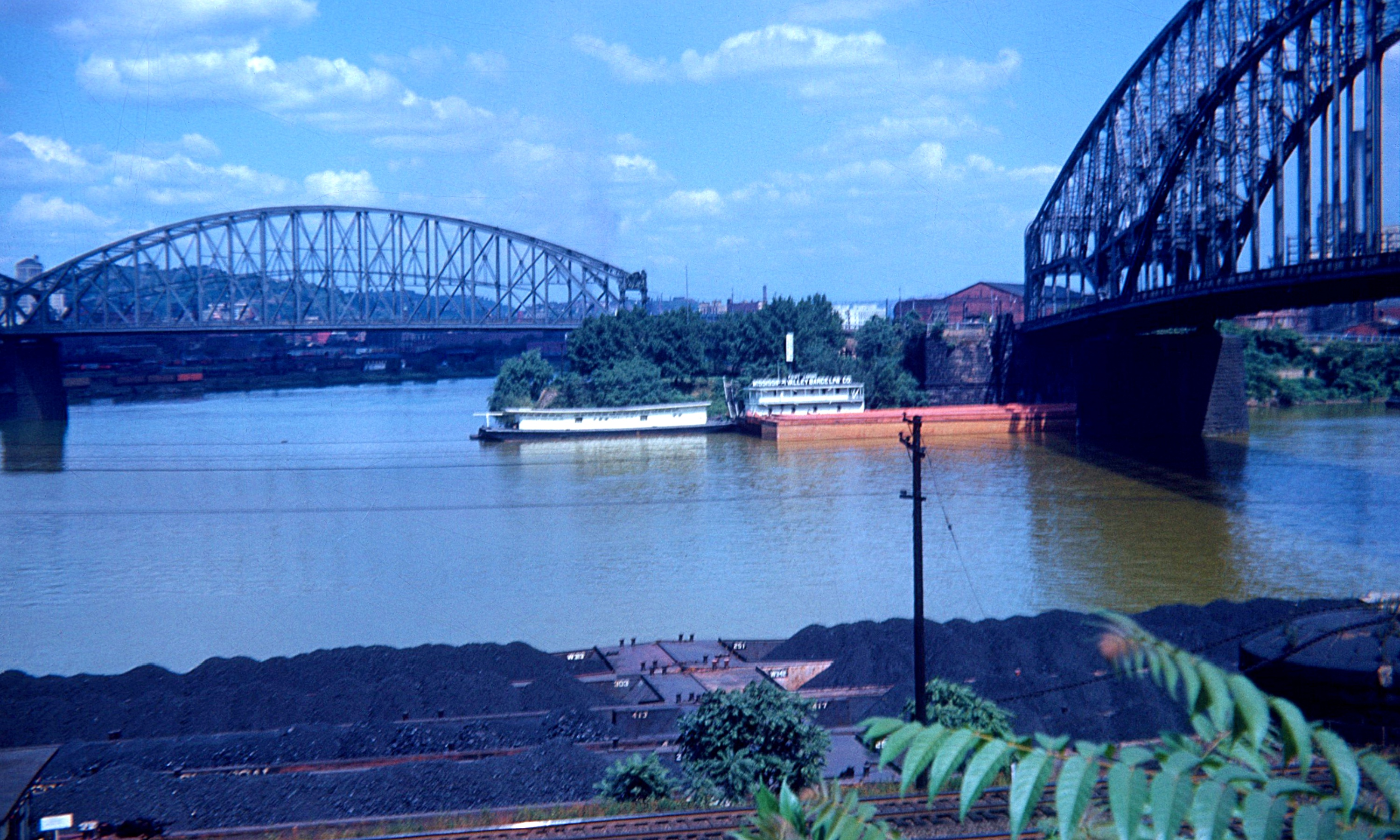
Future site of the park in 1951, showing the Point Bridge II (right) and the Manchester Bridge (left).

During the city's early history, the Point became a hub for industry and transportation. By the 1930s it was occupied by warehouses and railroad yards. Frank Lloyd Wright commented in 1935 that the city had wasted the potential of its rivers and hilly landscape. In 1945, the situation in this regard was even worse; four years of World War II and eight years of the Great Depression had permitted urban blight to make substantial inroads. The total assessed property value in the Golden Triangle was at a record low and falling. At the point, rarely used railroad facilities included 15 acres (61,000 m^{2}) of yards (60000 m^{2}) and half a mile (800 m) of elevated train tracks.

City leaders wanted to alleviate traffic congestion in the city. The Manchester Bridge and Point Bridge met at the point in a way that left no room for the interchange required by the volume of traffic. The growth of the city had made parking a serious problem as well. Robert Moses, who had developed the traffic scheme for New York City, was brought in and published a traffic plan in 1939. He offered a circular park surrounded by approach roads connecting the bridges to the city. His plan retained the existing bridges, but most of the experts brought in to examine the problem called for the bridges to be relocated away from the Point, creating more space for adjoining access roads and interchanges.

Although the site had substantial problems, Robert Alberts observes that "the condition, in the view of the city planner, was almost perfect". The Point had few property owners who needed to be bought out, few residents who would need relocation, and few structures worth preserving. Architects and planners could treat it as a tabula rasa.

During the course of the Second World War, federal and local authorities established three goals for the site: "the creation of a park commemorating the site's history, improved traffic circulation through the construction of new roads and bridges, and designation of a portion of the site for new office buildings, intended to stimulate private interest in the Golden Triangle". The Allegheny Conference on Community Development became a driving force for these changes. Edgar Kaufmann, a Pittsburgh department store owner, sat on the board of the Conference and became chair of the 28-member committee convened to look into the Point Park problem.

Kaufmann wanted a plan for the Point that was more urban and developed than the park others were imagining. In particular, Kaufmann was a major supporter of Pittsburgh Civic Light Opera and wanted to provide it with a permanent building. He brought in Wright, by that time a preeminent architect, who had done numerous other projects for Kaufmann in the past, including Kaufmann's landmark home at Fallingwater and an unbuilt design for a parking garage.

=== Construction of Point Park ===
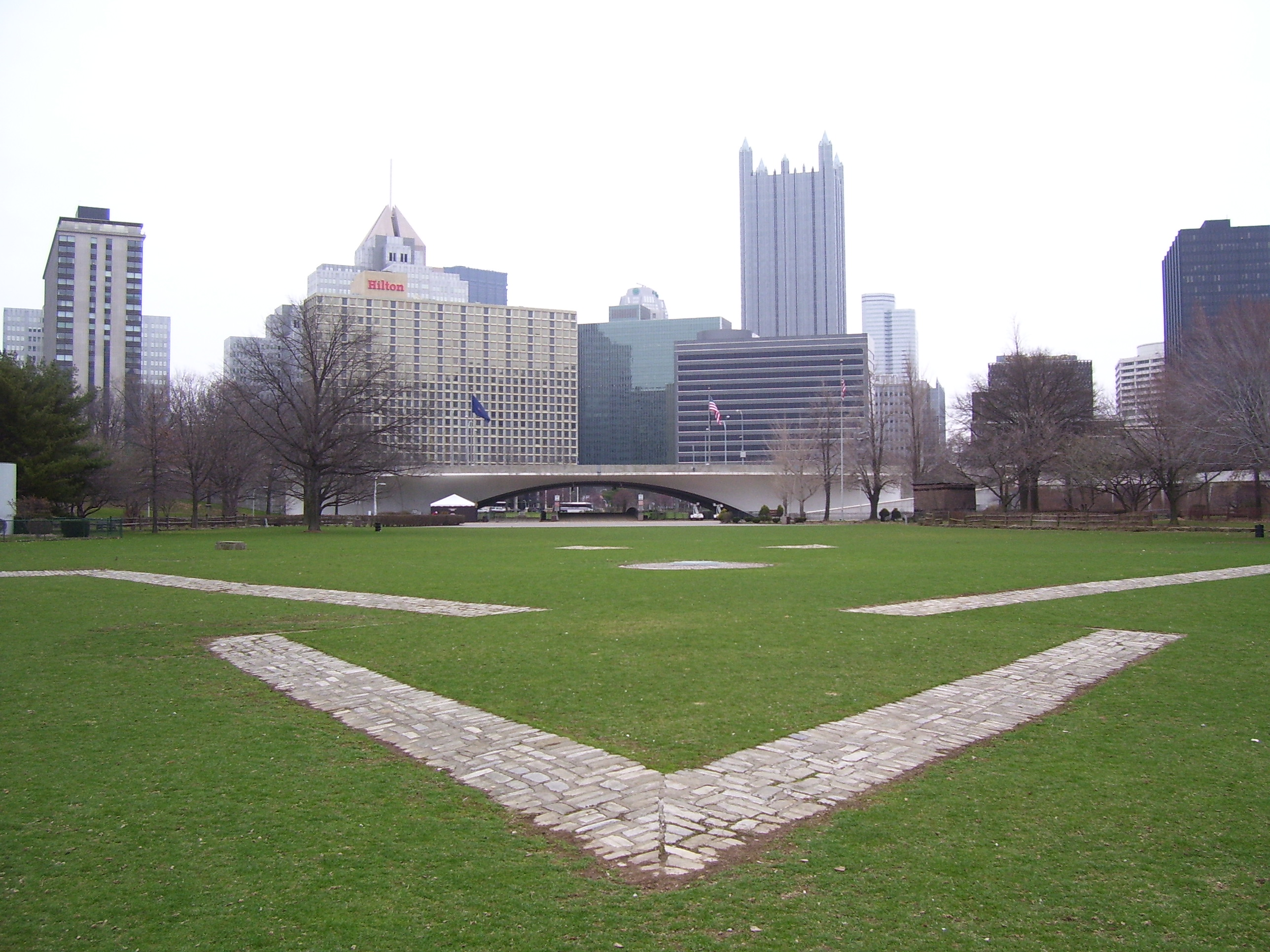
Brick pavers formerly marked the outline of where Fort Duquesne was located. The bricks have since been replaced with granite slabs.

Plans for Point Park Civic Center fell through and ultimately, the site was turned into a park with historic and recreational aspects, Point State Park. The Fort Pitt blockhouse remained intact, and three of the five bastions of the fort have been restored. The state acquired almost all property for the site by 1949, at a cost of $7,588,500 ($ 103 million in 2025); the park was finally completed in August 1974. Areas adjoining the park were condemned to permit commercial development, most notably Gateway Center.

=== 21st century ===
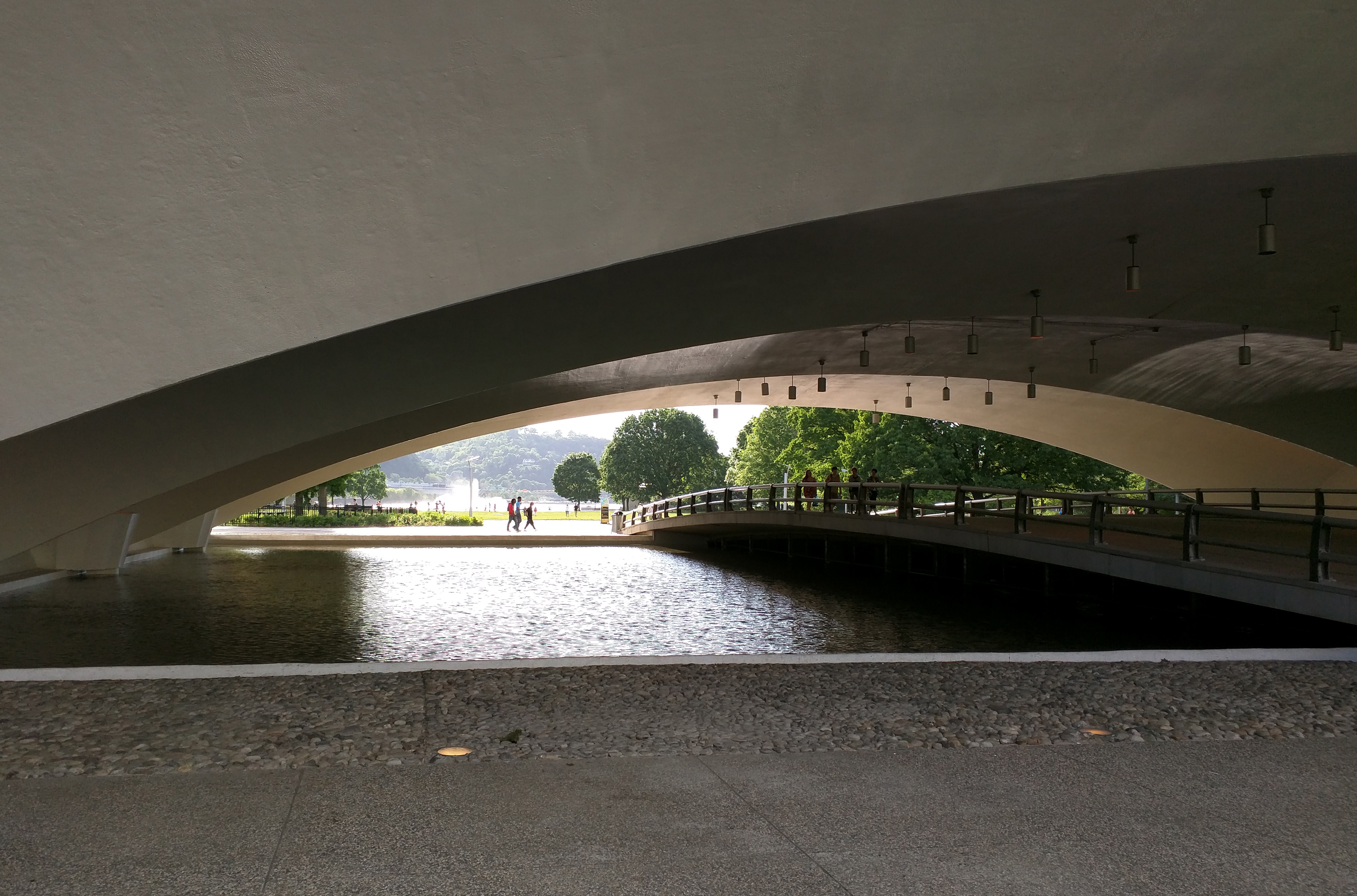
The underpass under Interstate 279 in the park

On October 11, 2006, Michael DeBerardinis, Secretary of the Pennsylvania Department of Conservation and Natural Resources, announced a $25 million plan to renovate Point State Park. The plans called for improving the green spaces within the park, expanding recreational opportunities, preserving historical installations, and updating outdated amenities. Those estimated costs grew to a final figure of $36 million . The project was scheduled to be completed within four years, with the majority of the work to be finished in time for Pittsburgh's 250th anniversary celebration in 2008.

Sections of the park had fallen into disuse since it was established in the summer of 1974. The homeless had used the trenches surrounding the foundations of the remains of Fort Pitt as a temporary shelter for years. Graffiti on the structures of the park had become a major problem. Sections of the park were littered with fence posts, cut logs, plastic drums, and rolled up snow drift fencing. The walkways were cracked and beginning to fall apart. The restoration project aimed to reestablish the park as a recreational destination.

Plans for the 2006 improvements to the park included installing new pumps and pipes in the fountain, establishing a seating area around the fountain and a wading area for children, restoring the river walk with steps that lead into the river, building kiosks for information and concessions, renovating the rest rooms, water taxi landings and surrounding docks, and installing wireless internet access hubs.

These plans were not put into place without some controversy. On January 25, 2007, thirteen members of two local labor unions were arrested for blocking access by contractors to the work sites at the remnants of Fort Pitt. The unions were protesting the use of four non-represented workers by the contractor. In addition, advocates for historical preservation disagreed with the decision to bury the remnants of the fort's walls, which could damage the bricks and remove the walls from public access.

Point State Park was reopened to the public in the spring of 2008. The renovation process took a year and a half to complete.

In late 2025 both the state and city funded more improvements and upgrades to the park, including fixing leaks and funding new fountain controllers, walkway and utility repairs, lightning and landscaping updating.

== Gallery ==
Moving downstream about 100 yards:

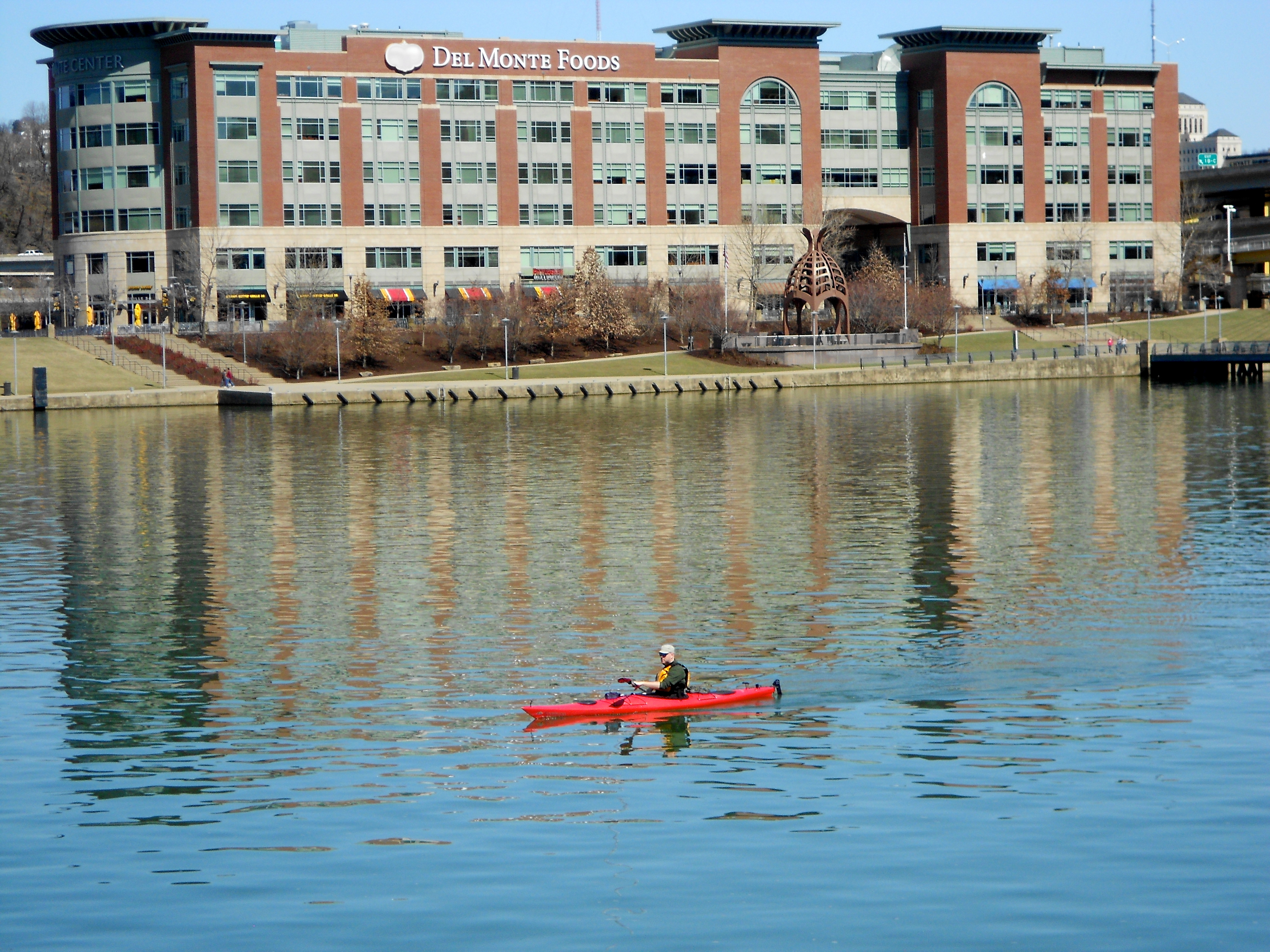
Del Monte office building in the background

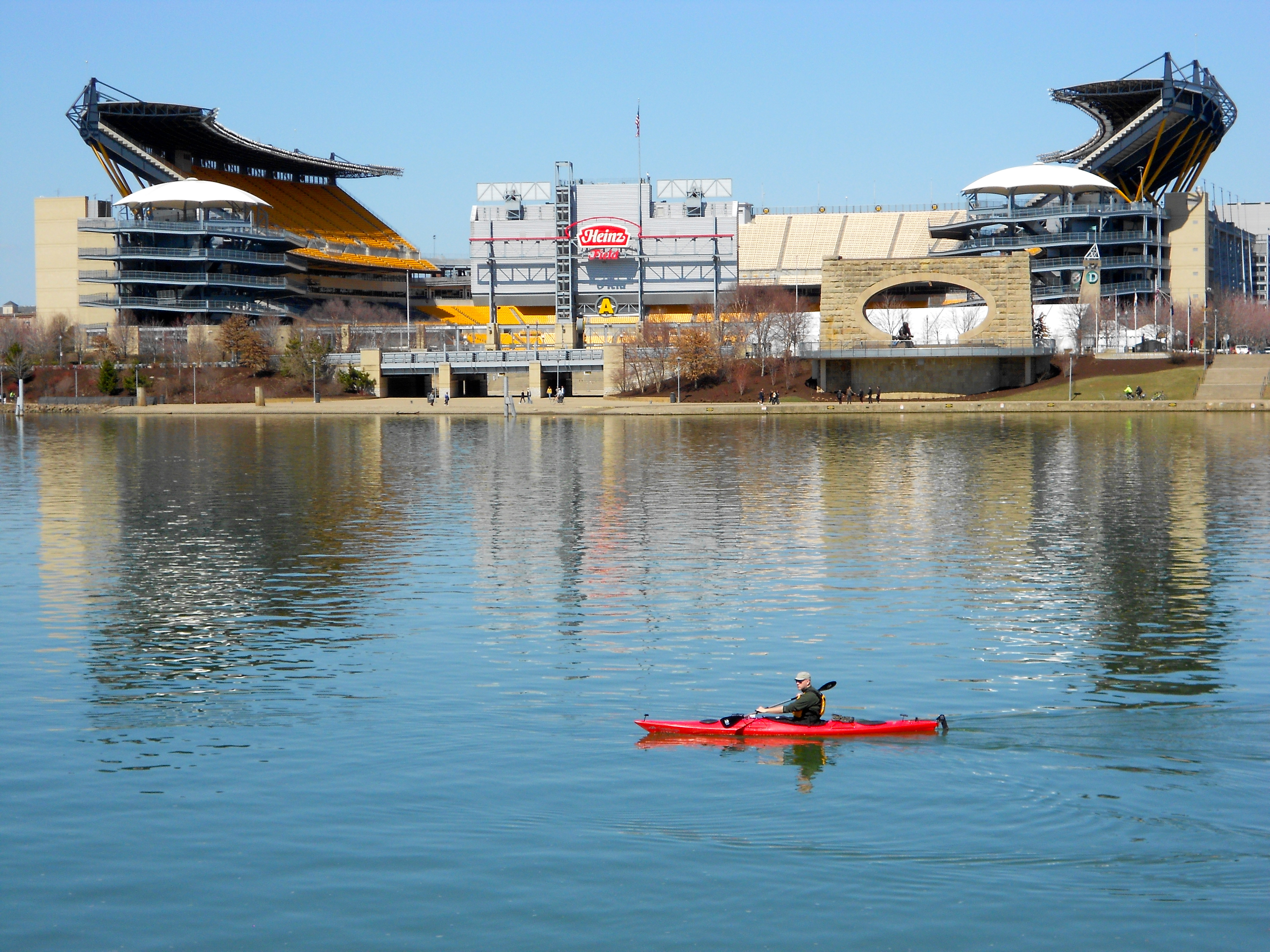
Acrisure Stadium in the background

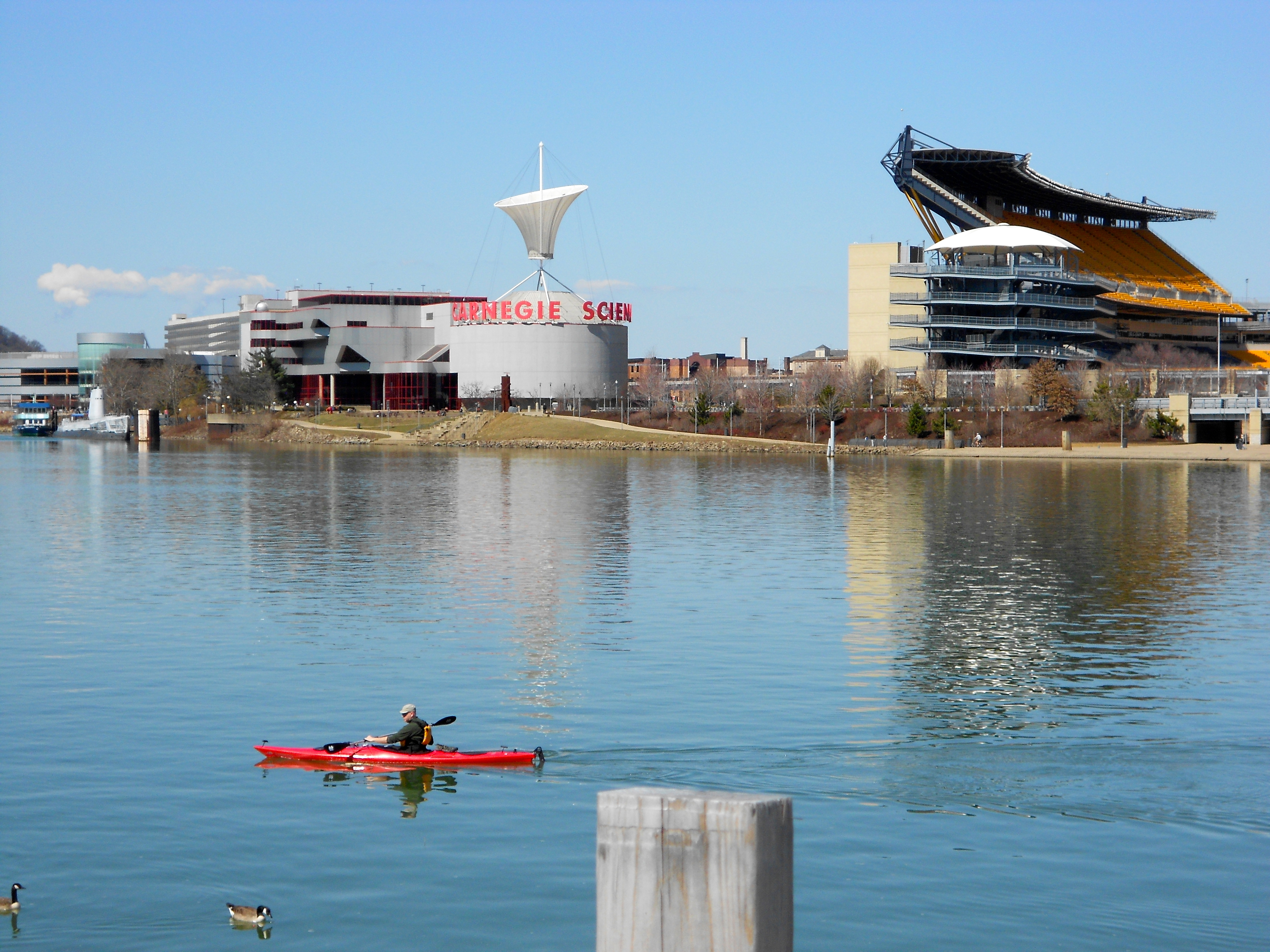
Acrisure Stadium and Carnegie Science Center

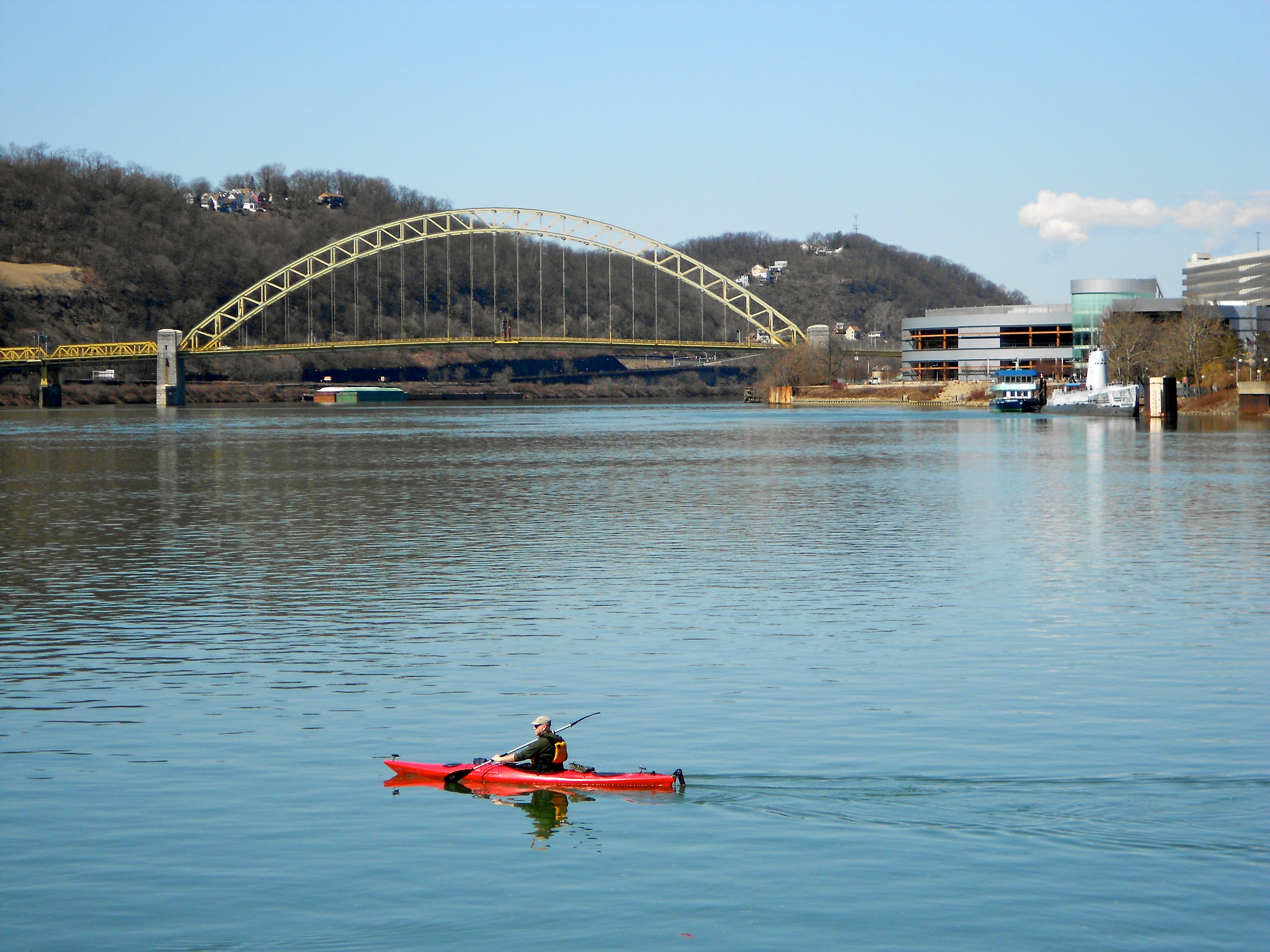
West End Bridge

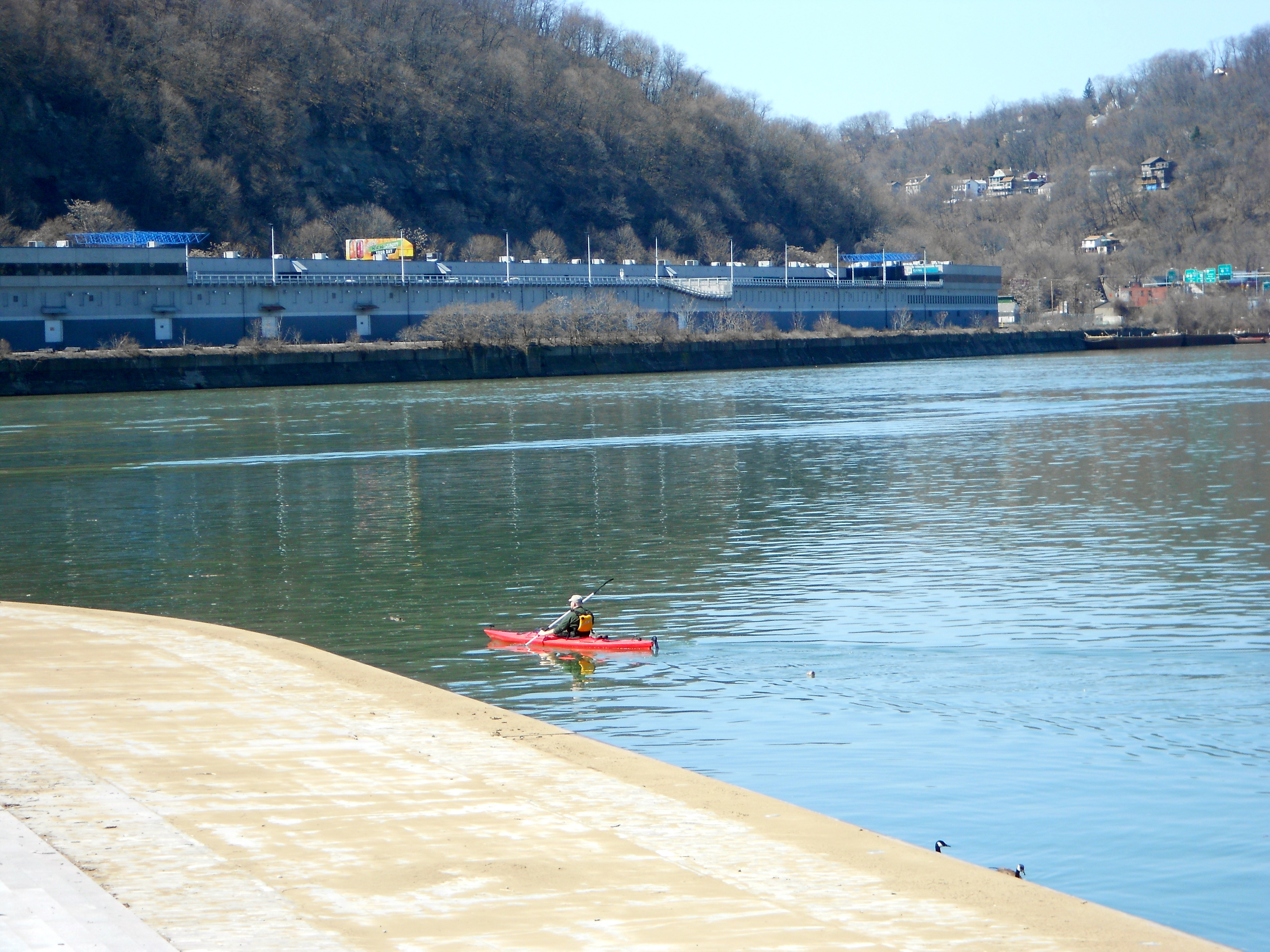
At the point
