= Russian Morse code =

Non-Latin Morse code for Russian Cyrillic

- Language: Russian
- Classification: non-Latin Morse code for Russian Cyrillic
- Succeeded by: MTK-2

The Russian Morse code approximates the Morse code for the Latin alphabet. It was enacted by the Russian government in 1856.

To memorize the codes, practitioners use mnemonics known as напевы (loosely translated "melodies" or "chants"). The "melody" corresponding to a character is a sung phrase: syllables containing the vowels а, о, and ы correspond to dashes and are sung long, while syllables containing other vowels, as well the syllable ай, correspond to dots and are sung short. The specific "melodies" employed differ among various schools.

The correspondences between Cyrillic and Latin letters were codified in MTK-2, KOI-7, and KOI-8.

== Table and melody ==
Russian character	Latin character	Morse code	"Melody"	Melody Romanized
А	A	· −	ай-даа	ay-daa
Б	B	− · · ·	баа-ки-те-кут	baa-ki-te-kut
В	W	· − −	ви-даа-лаа	vi-daa-laa
Г	G	− − ·	гаа-раа-жи, гаа-гаа-рин	gaa-raa-zhi, gaa-gaa-rin
Д	D	− · ·	доо-ми-ки	doo-mi-ki
Е Ё	E	·	есть	yest
Ж	V	· · · −	жи-ви-те-таак	zhi-vi-te-taak
З	Z	− − · ·	заа-каа-ти-ки, заа-моо-чи-ки	zaa-kaa-ti-ki, zaa-moh-tchi-ki,
И	I	· ·	и-ди	i-di
Й	J	· − − −	и краат-коо-ее, йес-наа паа-раа	i kraat-koh-ey, yes-naa paa-raa
К	K	− · −	каак же таак?, каак-де-лаа	kaak zhe taak? kaak-de-laa
Л	L	· − · ·	лу-наа-ти-ки	lu-naa-ti-ki
М	M	− −	маа-маа	maa-maa
Н	N	− ·	ноо-мер	noh-mer
О	O	− − −	оо-коо-лоо	oh-koh-loh
П	P	· − − ·	пи-лаа-поо-ёт, пи-лаа-ноо-ет	pi-laa-poh-yot, pi-laa-poh-yet
Р	R	· − ·	ре-шаа-ет	re-shaa-yet
С	S	· · ·	си-ни-е, си-не-е, са-мо-лёт	si-ni-ye, si-ne-ye, sa-mo-lyot
Т	T	−	таак	taak
У	U	· · −	у-нес-лоо	u-nes-loh
Ф	F	· · − ·	фи-ли-моон-чик	fi-li-mone-tchik
Х	H	· · · ·	хи-ми-чи-те	khi-mi-tchi-te
Ц	C	− · − ·	цаа-пли-наа-ши, цаа-пли-хоо-дят	tsaa-pli-naa-shi, tsaa-pli-khoo-dyat
Ч	ö	− − − ·	чаа-шаа-тоо-нет, чее-лоо-вее-чек	chaa-shaa-toh-net, chey-loh-vey-tchek
Ш	ch	− − − −	шаа-роо-ваа-рыы	shaa-roh-vaa-riy
Щ	Q	− − · −	щаа-ваам-не-шаа	shchaa-vaam-ne-shaa
Ъ	ñ	− − · − −	ээ-тоо-твёр-дыый-знаак, твёёр-дыый-не-мяяг-киий	ey-toh-tvyor-diiy-znaak, tvyoor-diiy-ne-myayag-kiiy
Ы	Y	− · − −	ыы-не-наа-доо	iy-ne-naa-doh
Ь	X	− · · −	тоо-мяг-кий-знаак	toh-myag-kiy-znaak
Э (Ѣ)	é	· · − · ·	э-ле-ктроо-ни-ки	e-le-ktroh-ni-ki
Ю	ü	· · − −	ю-ли-аа-наа	yu-li-aa-naa
Я	ä	· − · −	я-маал-я-маал	ya-maal-ya-maal
1		· − − − −	и-тооль-коо-оо-днаа	i-tohl-koh-oh-dnaa
2		· · − − −	две не-хоо-роо-шоо	dve ne-khoh-roh-shoh
3		· · · − −	три те-бе-маа-лоо	tri te-be-maa-loh
4		· · · · −	че-тве-ри-те-каа	che-tve-ri-te-kaa
5		· · · · ·	пя-ти-ле-ти-е	pya-ti-le-ti-ye
6		− · · · ·	поо-шес-ти бе-ри, шеесть по-ка бе-ри	poh-shes-ti be-ri, sheyest po-ka be-ri
7		− − · · ·	даа-даа-се-ме-ри, сеемь сеемь хо-ро-шо, даай-даай-за-ку-рить	daa-daa-se-me-ri, seyem seyem kho-ro-sho, daay-daay-za-ku-pit
8		− − − · ·	воо-сьмоо-гоо-и-ди	voh-smoh-goh-i-di
9		− − − − ·	ноо-наа-ноо-наа-ми	noh-naa-noh-naa-mi
		− − − − −	нооль-тоо-оо-коо-лоо	nohl-toh-oh-koh-lo
.		· · · · · ·	сеть сети сеть сети	set seti set seti
,		· − · − · −
:		− − − · · ·
;		− · − · −
()		− · − − · −
'		· − − − − ·
"		· − · · − ·
—		− · · · · −
/		− · · − ·	дрообь здесь пред-стаавь-те	drohb zdes pred-staav-te
?		· · − − · ·	вы ку-даа смоо-три-те?	vi ku-daa smoh-tri-te?
!		− − · · − −	гаа-даа-ли три браа-таа	gaa-daa-li tri braa-taa
-		− · · · −	рааз-де-ли-те-каа	raaz-de-li-te-kaa
Error/redo		· · · · · · · ·	хи-ми-чи-те хи-ми-чи-те	khi-mi-tchi-te khi-mi-tchi-te
@		· − − · − ·

== See also ==
- Morse code
- Morse code for non-Latin alphabets
