= The CW Operators' Club =

International organization for radio hams

- Abbreviation: CWops
- Formation: January 2010
- Type: Non-profit organization
- Purpose: Advocacy, Education
- Region served: Worldwide Membership
- Members: Over 3000
- Website: http://www.cwops.org/

The CW Operators' Club, commonly known as CWops, is an international organization, in membership and management, for amateur radio operators who enjoy communicating using Morse Code. Its mission is to foster the use of CW, whether for contesting, DXing, traffic handling, or engaging in conversations. A CWops nominee must be capable of sending and receiving International Morse Code at no less than 25 words per minute using the English language and submit dues. CWops is an activity-based organization that sponsors many events. The CWops are dedicated to promoting goodwill and education to amateur radio operators throughout the world. Many members are notable contesters, DXers, and QRQ (high speed) Morse Code operators.

== Name origin ==
CW is an abbreviation for Continuous Wave, describing the mode in which Morse code is most often transmitted. A transmitter is simply keyed on and off, and the presence or absence of carrier is decoded in the receiver as the presence or absence of a tone.

== See also ==
- Wireless telegraphy
