= Morse code mnemonics =

Systems to remember Morse characters

Morse code mnemonics are systems to represent the sound of Morse characters in a way intended to be easy to remember. Since every one of these mnemonics requires a two-step mental translation between sound and character, none of these systems are useful for using manual Morse at practical speeds. Amateur radio clubs can provide resources to learn Morse code.

== Cross-linguistic ==
=== Visual mnemonic ===
Baden-Powell's mnemonic chart from 1918

Visual mnemonic charts have been devised over the ages. Baden-Powell included one in the Girl Guides handbook in 1918.

A contemporary Morse code chart

== Morse Map ==
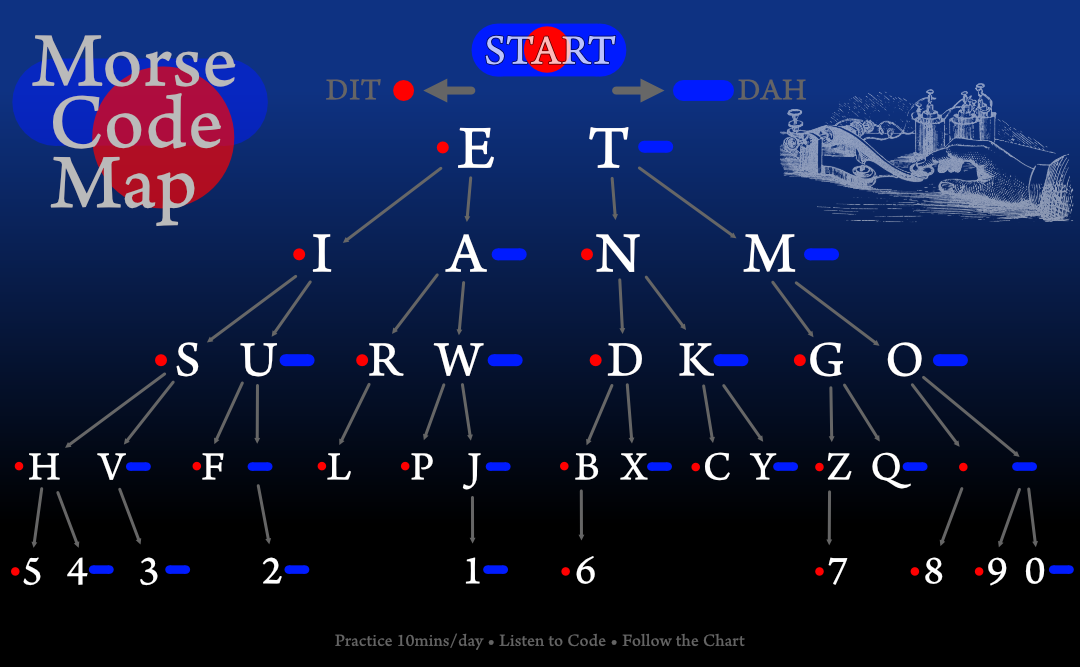
A visual map of Morse Code Dits and Dahs shown arranged in layers according to length.

This visual map of Dits and Dahs is arranged from top to bottom by character length (e.g. first layer is just one sound — a dit or a dah for E or T, the second layer contains letters formed by two sounds, the third layer by three sounds, etc.) Dits to the Left and Dahs to the right.

== Other systems ==
Other visual mnemonic systems have been created for Morse code, mapping the elements of the Morse code characters onto pictures for easy memorization. For instance, "R" ( ▄ ▄▄▄ ▄ ) might be represented as a "racecar" seen in a profile view, with the two wheels of the racecar being the dits and the body being the dah.

== English ==
=== Syllabic mnemonics ===
Syllabic mnemonics are based on the principle of associating a word or phrase to each Morse code letter, with stressed syllables standing for a dah and unstressed ones for a dit. There is no well-known complete set of syllabic mnemonics for English, but various mnemonics do exist for individual letters.

Letter	Morse Code	Mnemonic
A	▄ ▄▄▄	say AHH a-PU a-PART
B	▄▄▄ ▄ ▄ ▄	BAND rat-a-tat BOB is the man BOOT to the head BE a good boy
C	▄▄▄ ▄ ▄▄▄ ▄	CATCH it CATCH it CO-ca CO-la; CHAR-lie's AN-gels
D	▄▄▄ ▄ ▄	DAD did it DRAC-u-la; DOCK-worker
E	▄	eek eye eh!
F	▄ ▄ ▄▄▄ ▄	did i FAIL it? fetch a FIRE-man
G	▄▄▄ ▄▄▄ ▄	GOD LOVES it GOOD GRAV-y; GREAT GATS-by
H	▄ ▄ ▄ ▄	ha ha ha ha hip-pi-ty hop
I	▄ ▄	did it i-an aye-aye
J	▄ ▄▄▄ ▄▄▄ ▄▄▄	in JAWS JAWS JAWS; I WANT YOU, JONES let's JUMP, JUMP, JUMP
K	▄▄▄ ▄ ▄▄▄	KAN-ga-ROO; KICK the CAN
L	▄ ▄▄▄ ▄ ▄	a LIGHT is lit los AN-ge-les to ELL with it a LA-dy-bug
M	▄▄▄ ▄▄▄	MA-MA; MAC-kie MES-ser; LIKE MIKE
N	▄▄▄ ▄	NAME it NIK-ki; NA-vy
O	▄▄▄ ▄▄▄ ▄▄▄	HO HO HO; OH MY GOD; ONE OF US
P	▄ ▄▄▄ ▄▄▄ ▄	is PA-PA in? a PRAY-ING abe
Q	▄▄▄ ▄▄▄ ▄ ▄▄▄	PAY DAY to-DAY (quid); GOD SAVE the QUEEN
R	▄ ▄▄▄ ▄	a RABB-it ro-TA-tion
S	▄ ▄ ▄	ss-ss-ss su-per-man sí-sí-sí
T	▄▄▄	TALL; TIM
U	▄ ▄ ▄▄▄	kiss a EWE un-der-NEATH u-ni-FORM
V	▄ ▄ ▄ ▄▄▄	vee-vee-vee VAH (the opening rhythm of Beethoven's 5th, or Beethoven's V'th) vick-tor-y VEE
W	▄ ▄▄▄ ▄▄▄	the WORLD WAR the WHITE WHALE
X	▄▄▄ ▄ ▄ ▄▄▄	CROSS at the DOOR; XY-lo-phone RAP; X marks the SPOT
Y	▄▄▄ ▄ ▄▄▄ ▄▄▄	WHY did I DIE? YOU'RE a COOL DUDE; YAK a YOUNG YAK; YELL-ow YO-YO
Z	▄▄▄ ▄▄▄ ▄ ▄	ZSA ZSA did it ZINC ZOO-keep-er

Character	Morse Code	Syllabic	Mnemonic
.	▄ ▄▄▄ ▄ ▄▄▄ ▄ ▄▄▄	a STOP a STOP a STOP	Periods are also known as "full stops".
,	▄▄▄ ▄▄▄ ▄ ▄ ▄▄▄ ▄▄▄	COM-MA, it's a COM-MA	Self-explanatory.
?	▄ ▄ ▄▄▄ ▄▄▄ ▄ ▄	it's a QUES-TION, is it?	Self-explanatory.
:	▄▄▄ ▄▄▄ ▄▄▄ ▄ ▄ ▄	HA-WAI-I stan-dard time	The clocks in Hawaii are always on standard time, and don't turn an hour ahead in the summer. Colons are used in displaying time in the USA (like in "10:23").
/	▄▄▄ ▄ ▄ ▄▄▄ ▄	SHAVE and a HAIR-cut	The rhythm from the musical routine. A barber is a slasher. (NOTE: also Fraction Bar and Division Sign)
"	▄ ▄▄▄ ▄ ▄ ▄▄▄ ▄	six-TY-six nine-TY-nine	Quotation marks resemble a 66 at the beginning of a quote, and a 99 at the end of a quote.
'	▄ ▄▄▄ ▄▄▄ ▄▄▄ ▄▄▄ ▄	and THIS STUFF GOES TO me!	An apostrophe may be used to denote ownership of property.
;	▄▄▄ ▄ ▄▄▄ ▄ ▄▄▄ ▄	A-list, B-list, C-list	A semicolon may be used to group ordered lists in the same sentence.

=== Word mnemonics ===
==== Independent words ====
This technique has you associate a word with each character. For a letter in the alphabet, the associated word will usually begin with the same letter. In that word, tall letters (those descending below the baseline or ascending above the mean line – b, d, f, g, h, j, k, l, p, q, t, or y) and capital letters represent dashes, while short letters (aceimnorsuvwxz) represent dots. To recall the Morse code for a character, try to visualize the word.

Letter	Mnemonic	Morse Code	Comments
A	at	▄ ▄▄▄	
B	bean	▄▄▄ ▄ ▄ ▄	
C	Cuba	▄▄▄ ▄ ▄▄▄ ▄	or alternatively, the name "Cate"
D	dam	▄▄▄ ▄ ▄	or "Dan", "dim" or many others
E	e	▄	just plain "e"
F	cafe	▄ ▄ ▄▄▄ ▄	
G	gym	▄▄▄ ▄▄▄ ▄	
H	ears	▄ ▄ ▄ ▄	as in "ears" are used to hear
I	in	▄ ▄	
J	edgy	▄ ▄▄▄ ▄▄▄ ▄▄▄	or alternatively, (j)"etty"
K	kit	▄▄▄ ▄ ▄▄▄	
L	else	▄ ▄▄▄ ▄ ▄	
M	M.A.	▄▄▄ ▄▄▄	Master of Arts degree; alternatively, the year 2000 in Roman numerals: "MM"
N	No	▄▄▄ ▄	as in "Dr. No", the first James Bond movie
O	Opp	▄▄▄ ▄▄▄ ▄▄▄	as in the Opposing side; alternatively, OPP (Ontario Provincial Police) or Off!
P	apps	▄ ▄▄▄ ▄▄▄ ▄	Something used on smart phones to practice Morse code
Q	plaq	▄▄▄ ▄▄▄ ▄ ▄▄▄	The first four letters of "plaque", ending at "q"
R	rye	▄ ▄▄▄ ▄	
S	sax	▄ ▄ ▄	
T	t	▄▄▄	just plain "t", or "T" as in "Mr. T"
U	ump	▄ ▄ ▄▄▄	as in umpire
V	veil	▄ ▄ ▄ ▄▄▄	or "veal"
W	why	▄ ▄▄▄ ▄▄▄	
X	foxy	▄▄▄ ▄ ▄ ▄▄▄	as in being as clever as a fox
Y	yell	▄▄▄ ▄ ▄▄▄ ▄▄▄	
Z	Zhou	▄▄▄ ▄▄▄ ▄ ▄	Zhou dynasty of China; or alternatively "Whiz" as in the brand-name 'Cheez Whiz'

==== Single sentence ====
This mnemonic uses the same mapping from tall and short letters to dashes and dots. The i^{th} word in the sentence represents the i^{th} letter of the alphabet. For instance the third word is "life", coding "-.-.", which is morse code for C, the third letter of the alphabet.

my love life has a vibe, the same as edgy pop star DJ Dr BBQ adds, glad she won't cut away all good gold lyre!

== Slavic languages ==
In Czech, the mnemonic device to remember letters in Morse code lies in remembering words or short phrases that begin with each appropriate letter and have a long vowel (i.e. á é í ó ú ý) for every dash and a short vowel (a e i o u y) for every dot. Additionally, some other sets of words with a particular theme have been thought up in Czech folklore, such as the following alcohol-themed set:

Letter	Morse Code	Czech word	Translation	Alternative (folklore)	Translation
A	▄ ▄▄▄	akát	Acacia	absťák	withdrawal symptoms
B	▄▄▄ ▄ ▄ ▄	blýska·vi·ce	lightning storm	blít až do·ma	vomit until at home
C	▄▄▄ ▄ ▄▄▄ ▄	cílovníci	aiming sights	cíl je výčep	the target is the taproom
D	▄▄▄ ▄ ▄	dálni·ce	highway	dám jed·no	I'll have one (beer)
E	▄	erb	coat of arms	ex	one-sip-drinking
F	▄ ▄ ▄▄▄ ▄	Fi·lipíny	Philippines	Fer·net píše	the Fernet's pungent
G	▄▄▄ ▄▄▄ ▄	Grón·ská zem	the land of Greenland	grón·ský rum	rum of Greenland
H	▄ ▄ ▄ ▄	ho·lu·bi·ce	dove (female)	hru·ško·vi·ce	Pear brandy
Ch	▄▄▄ ▄▄▄ ▄▄▄ ▄▄▄	chléb nám dává	(he) gives us bread	chvát·ám k pí·pám	I rush to the faucets
I	▄ ▄	ib·is	Ibis	I·ron	Iron (window cleaning agent with alcohol content)
J	▄ ▄▄▄ ▄▄▄ ▄▄▄	jasmín bí·lý	white Jasmine	Jabčák bí·lý	White Apple brandy
K	▄▄▄ ▄ ▄▄▄	království	kingdom	kýbl vín	pot of wines
L	▄ ▄▄▄ ▄ ▄	lední hokej	ice hockey	likéreček	little liquor
M	▄▄▄ ▄▄▄	má·vá	waving	mží z-píp	it's sprinkling out of faucets
N	▄▄▄ ▄	ná rod	nation	návyk	habit
O	▄▄▄ ▄▄▄ ▄▄▄	ó náš pán	oh, our lord	ó můj líh	oh, my alcohol
P	▄ ▄▄▄ ▄▄▄ ▄	papír·níci	paper-makers	pivní tácek	beer coaster
Q	▄▄▄ ▄▄▄ ▄ ▄▄▄	kví·lí orkán	wailing hurricane	kví·lím ožrán	I wail drunken
R	▄ ▄▄▄ ▄	rarášek	Imp	rumíček	little rum
S	▄ ▄ ▄	se·ke·ra	axe	sud je tu	the barrel's here
T	▄▄▄	tón	tone	té	tea (archaic); that one (singular feminine genitive/dative/locative); e.g. "Bydlím v té vesnici." – "I live in that village."; see also: https://en.wiktionary.org/wiki/t%C3%A9#Czech
U	▄ ▄ ▄▄▄	u·čený	erudite	uch·lastán	fully loaded
V	▄ ▄ ▄ ▄▄▄	vy·vo·lený	the chosen one	vod·ka finská	Finnish vodka
W	▄ ▄▄▄ ▄▄▄	waltrův vůz	Walter's carriage	whiskou plout	to float through Whisky
X	▄▄▄ ▄ ▄ ▄▄▄	Xéno·kratés	Xenocrates	k sýru burčák	new half-fermented wine with cheese
Y	▄▄▄ ▄ ▄▄▄ ▄▄▄	Ýgar má·vá	Ygar is waving	ý, jsem zlá·mán	ee, I'm a mess
Z	▄▄▄ ▄▄▄ ▄ ▄	Zrád·ná že·na	perfidious woman	zlí·skám se hned	I get smashed quickly

In Polish, which does not distinguish long and short vowels, Morse mnemonics are also words or short phrases that begin with each appropriate letter, but dash is coded as a syllable containing an "o" (or "ó"), while a syllable containing another vowel codes for dot. For some letters, multiple mnemonics are in use; the table shows one example.

Letter	Morse Code	Polish word	Translation
A	▄ ▄▄▄	azot	nitrogen
B	▄▄▄ ▄ ▄ ▄	botanika	botany
C	▄▄▄ ▄ ▄▄▄ ▄	co mi zrobisz	what will you do to me
D	▄▄▄ ▄ ▄	dolina	valley
E	▄	Ełk	Ełk
F	▄ ▄ ▄▄▄ ▄	filantropia	philanthropy
G	▄▄▄ ▄▄▄ ▄	gospoda	inn/tavern
H	▄ ▄ ▄ ▄	halabarda	halberd
Ch	▄▄▄ ▄▄▄ ▄▄▄ ▄▄▄	chlorowodór	hydrogen chloride
I	▄ ▄	igła	needle
J	▄ ▄▄▄ ▄▄▄ ▄▄▄	jednokonno	on/with one horse
K	▄▄▄ ▄ ▄▄▄	kolano	knee
L	▄ ▄▄▄ ▄ ▄	Leonidas	Leonidas
Ł	▄ ▄▄▄ ▄ ▄ ▄▄▄	[no mnemonic]	
M	▄▄▄ ▄▄▄	motor	motor
N	▄▄▄ ▄	noga	leg
O	▄▄▄ ▄▄▄ ▄▄▄	Opoczno	Opoczno
P	▄ ▄▄▄ ▄▄▄ ▄	Peloponez	Peloponnese
R	▄ ▄▄▄ ▄	retorta	retort
S	▄ ▄ ▄	Sahara	Sahara
T	▄▄▄	tor	track/rail line
U	▄ ▄ ▄▄▄	Ursynów	Ursynów
W	▄ ▄▄▄ ▄▄▄	winorośl	grapevine (plant)
Y	▄▄▄ ▄ ▄▄▄ ▄▄▄	York, Hull, Oxford	three British university towns
Z	▄▄▄ ▄▄▄ ▄ ▄	Złotoryja	Złotoryja

== Hebrew ==
Invented in 1922 by Zalman Cohen, a communication soldier in the Haganah organization. The hiriq (/i/ vowel) represents a dot and the patah or qamatz (/a/ vowel) represent a dash.

Letter	Morse Code	Word	Letter	Morse Code	Word
א	▄▄▄ ▄	אִמָּא	ל	▄ ▄ ▄▄▄ ▄	לִבַּבְתִּנִי
ב	▄ ▄ ▄ ▄▄▄	בַּשְּׁלִי לִי מִיץ	מ	▄▄▄ ▄▄▄	מַפָּ"ם
ג	▄ ▄▄▄ ▄▄▄	גַּנָּבִים	נ	▄ ▄▄▄	נָעִים
ד	▄ ▄ ▄▄▄	דָלִיתִי	ס	▄ ▄▄▄ ▄ ▄▄▄	סָבִי אָבִי
ה	▄▄▄ ▄▄▄ ▄▄▄	הֲגָנָה	ע	▄▄▄ ▄▄▄ ▄▄▄ ▄	עִיר הַנַּמָּל
ו	▄	וִי	פ	▄ ▄▄▄ ▄▄▄ ▄	פִּיל קַנָּדִי
ז	▄ ▄ ▄▄▄ ▄▄▄	זַמָּר לִירִי	צ	▄▄▄ ▄▄▄ ▄	צִיטָטָה
ח	▄ ▄ ▄ ▄	חִכִּיתִי לִי	ק	▄▄▄ ▄ ▄▄▄ ▄▄▄	קַטָּרִינָה
ט	▄▄▄ ▄ ▄	טִיףּ טִפָּה	ר	▄ ▄▄▄ ▄	רִנָתִי
י	▄ ▄	יִידִישׁ	ש	▄ ▄ ▄	שִׁירִי לִי
כ	▄▄▄ ▄ ▄▄▄	כַּבִּירָה	ת	▄▄▄	תָּו

== Indonesian ==
In Indonesia, one mnemonic commonly taught in Scouting is remembering words that begin with each appropriate letter and substituting the o vowel for every dash and other vowels (a, i, u, and e) for every dot.

Letter	Morse Code	Word
A	▄ ▄▄▄	alok
B	▄▄▄ ▄ ▄ ▄	bocah kecil
C	▄▄▄ ▄ ▄▄▄ ▄	coca-cola
D	▄▄▄ ▄ ▄	doremi
E	▄	eh
F	▄ ▄ ▄▄▄ ▄	fanta loe
G	▄▄▄ ▄▄▄ ▄	gotongin
H	▄ ▄ ▄ ▄	hayamwuruk
I	▄ ▄	ipin
J	▄ ▄▄▄ ▄▄▄ ▄▄▄	jago loro
K	▄▄▄ ▄ ▄▄▄	komando
L	▄ ▄▄▄ ▄ ▄	lego dia
M	▄▄▄ ▄▄▄	motor
N	▄▄▄ ▄	nomer
O	▄▄▄ ▄▄▄ ▄▄▄	om toto
P	▄ ▄▄▄ ▄▄▄ ▄	pertolongan
Q	▄▄▄ ▄▄▄ ▄ ▄▄▄	qomokaro
R	▄ ▄▄▄ ▄	rasome
S	▄ ▄ ▄	samlekum
T	▄▄▄	tol
U	▄ ▄ ▄▄▄	upin-o
V	▄ ▄ ▄ ▄▄▄	versi gayo
W	▄ ▄▄▄ ▄▄▄	wahyoo
X	▄▄▄ ▄ ▄ ▄▄▄	xosendero
Y	▄▄▄ ▄ ▄▄▄ ▄▄▄	yosimono
Z	▄▄▄ ▄▄▄ ▄ ▄	zoro-aster

== Research on Morse code mnemonics ==
The effectiveness of mnemonic techniques in Morse code instruction has been examined in military training research. A 1979 review by Douglas Griffith for the United States Army Research Institute for the Behavioral and Social Sciences discussed research conducted by the Naval Training Analysis and Evaluation Group on pictorial mnemonics for learning Morse code. The review reported that mnemonic-based instruction produced better results than traditional instruction during the acquisition phase for both sending and receiving skills, with a greater improvement in sending. However, no significant difference between the instructional approaches was found during a later performance assessment involving the reception of flashing-light messages.
