= Morse code =

Transmission of language with brief pulses

Morse Code
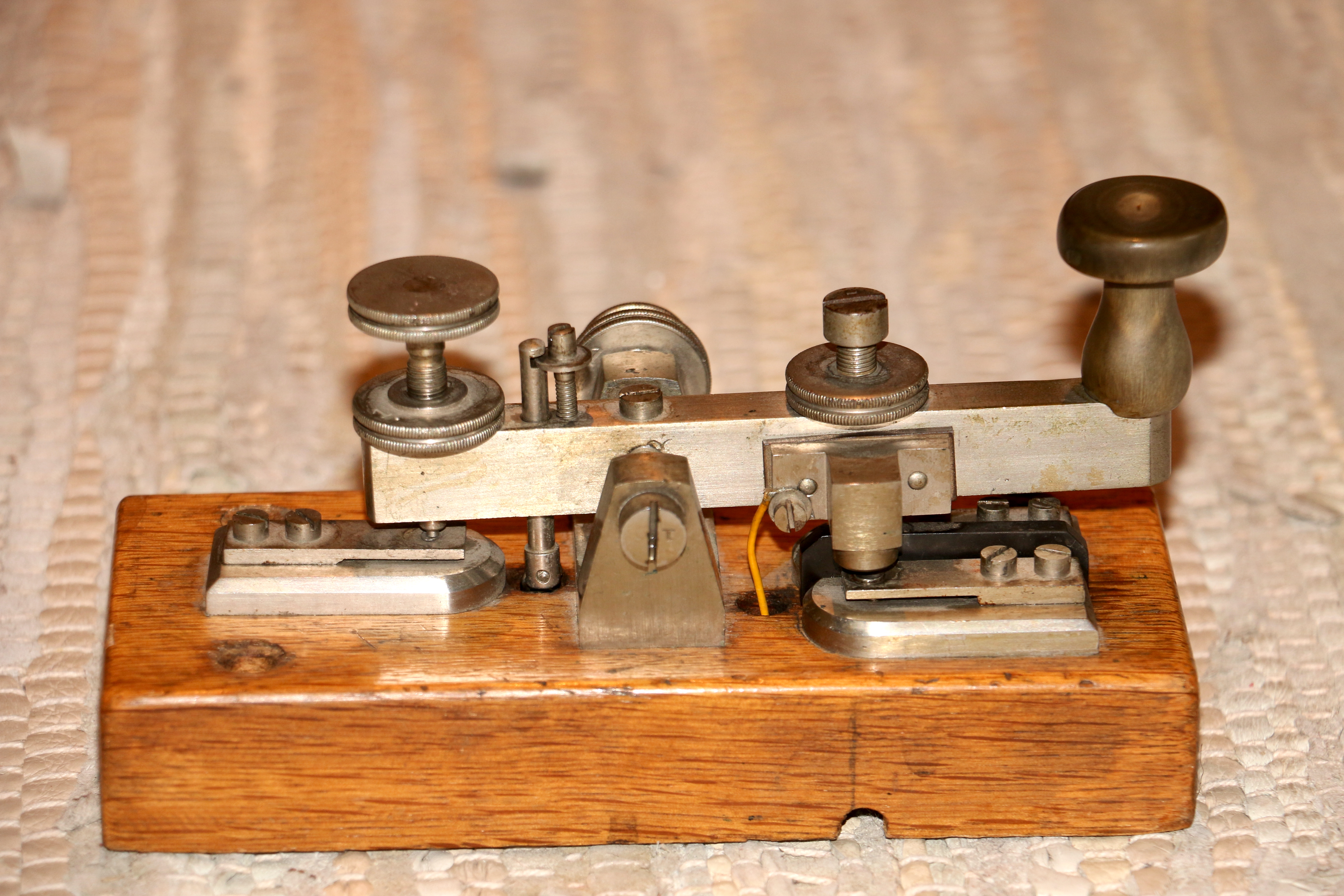
- This Morse key was originally used by Gotthard railway, later by a shortwave radio amateur.

Technical Specifications
- Classification: Character encoding / Line code
- Primary Medium: Telegraphy, radio (Continuous wave), heliograph, sound, visible light
- Basic Units: Dit (1 unit); Dah (3 units); Element space (1 unit); Letter space (3 units); Word space (7 units)
- Code Type: Variable-length binary sequence (using duration modulation)
- Signaling Rate: Measured in WPM or Baud (typically 5 to 40+ WPM manual)
- Bandwidth: Ultra-narrowband (~50 Hz to 150 Hz standard RF bandwidth)
- Standardized By: ITU (Recommendation ITU-R M.1677-1)

Historical Overview
- Inventors: Samuel Morse; Alfred Vail; Friedrich Clemens Gerke (International version)
- Inception: 1837 (American Morse); 1848 (Gerke variant); 1865 (International standard)
- Current Status: Obsolete for commercial/military use Active in Amateur radio (CW mode) and aviation (NDB/VOR identification)

Chart of the Morse code 26 letters and 10 numerals

Morse code is a telecommunications method which encodes text characters as standardized sequences of two different signal durations, called dots and dashes, or dits and dahs. It is named after Samuel Morse, one of several developers of the system. Morse's preliminary proposal for a telegraph code was replaced by an alphabet-based code developed by Alfred Vail, the engineer working with Morse. Vail's version was used for commercial telegraphy in North America. Friedrich Gerke simplified Vail's code to produce the code adopted in Europe, and most of the alphabetic part of the (ITU) "Morse" is copied from Gerke's revision.

The ITU International Morse code encodes the 26 basic Latin letters A to Z, one accented Latin letter É, the Indo-Arabic numerals 0 to 9, and some punctuation and messaging procedural signals (prosigns). There is no distinction between upper and lower case letters. Each code symbol is formed by a sequence of dits and dahs. The dit duration can vary for signal clarity and operator skill, but for any one message, once the rhythm is established, a half-beat is the basic unit of time measurement. The duration of a dah is three times the duration of a dit. Each dit or dah within an encoded character is followed by a period of signal absence, called a space, equal to the dit duration. The letters of a word are separated by a space of duration equal to three dits, and words are separated by a space equal to seven dits. (Note: Until 1949, words were separated by a space equal to five dits.)

Morse code can be memorized and sent in a form perceptible to the human senses, e.g. via sound waves or visible light, so that it can be directly interpreted by persons trained in it. Morse code is usually transmitted by on-off keying of an information-carrying medium such as electric current, radio waves, visible light, or sound waves. The current or wave is present during the time period of the dit or dah and absent during the time between dits and dahs. Since many natural languages use more than the 26 letters of the Latin alphabet, Morse alphabets have been developed for those, largely by transliteration of existing codes.

To increase transmission efficiency, Vail designed the original alphabetic code so the duration of each symbol was approximately inverse to the frequency that the character it represents occurs in English text. After revisions that led to ITU Morse code, the assignment of codes to characters in a few cases became non-optimal, although many encodings are. For instance, the most common letter in English, E, has the shortest code – a single dit. Because code elements are specified relatively, by proportion, rather than fixed duration, the code is usually sent at the highest rate the receiver is capable of decoding.

== Development and history ==
=== Pre-Morse telegraphs and codes ===
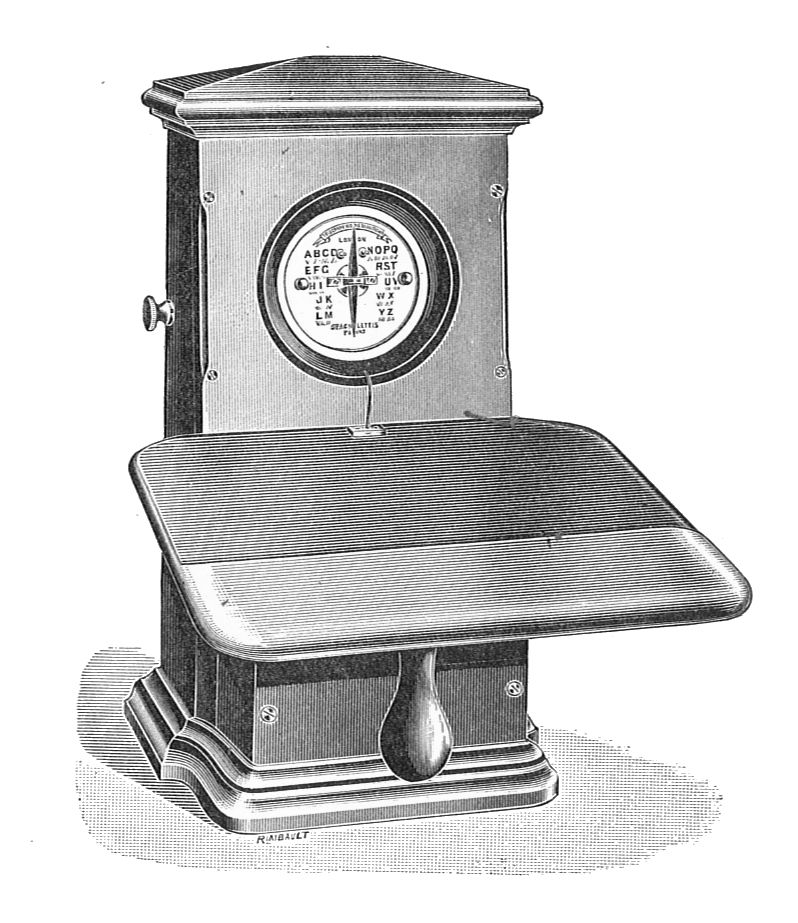
Single needle telegraph instrument

Early in the nineteenth century, European experimenters made progress with electrical signalling systems, using a variety of techniques including static electricity and electricity from Voltaic piles producing electrochemical and electromagnetic changes. These experimental designs were precursors to practical telegraphic applications.

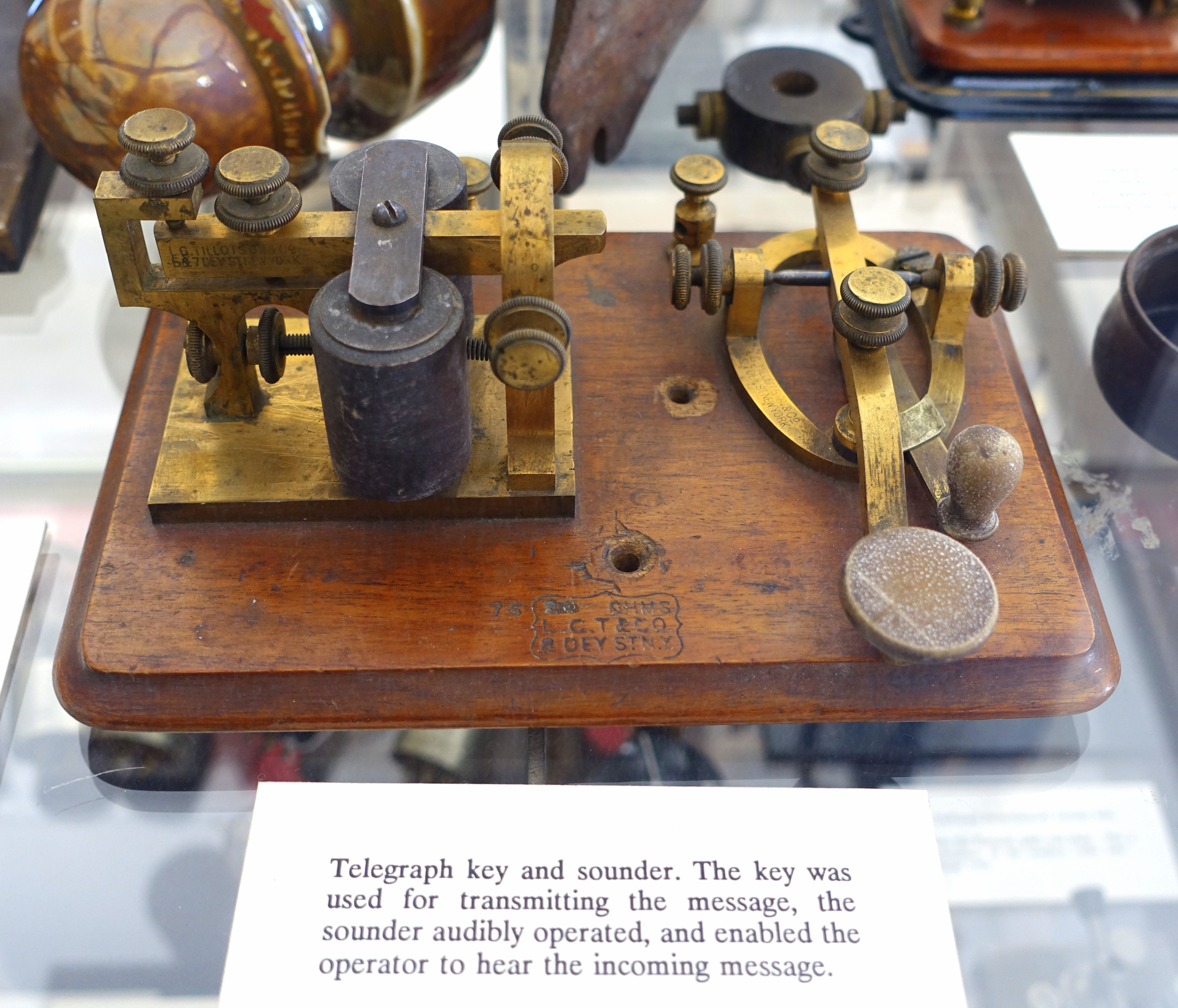
Telegraph key and sounder; the signal is "on" when the knob is pressed, and "off" when it is released, length and timing of the dits and dahs are entirely controlled by the telegraphist

Following the discovery of electromagnetism by Hans Christian Ørsted in 1820 and the invention of the electromagnet by William Sturgeon in 1824, there were developments in electromagnetic telegraphy in Europe and America. Pulses of electric current were sent along wires to control an electromagnet in the receiving instrument. Many of the earliest telegraph systems used a single-needle system which gave a very simple and robust instrument. However, it was slow because the receiving operator had to alternate between looking at the needle and writing down the message. In Morse code, a deflection of the needle to the left corresponded to a dit and a deflection to the right to a dah. The needle clicked each time it moved to the right or left. By making the two clicks sound different (by installing one ivory and one metal stop), transmissions on the single needle device became audible as well as visible, which led in turn to the Double Plate Sounder System.

William Cooke and Charles Wheatstone in Britain developed an electrical telegraph that used electromagnets in its receivers. They obtained an English patent in June 1837 and demonstrated it on the London and Birmingham Railway, making it the first commercial telegraph. Carl Friedrich Gauss and Wilhelm Eduard Weber (1833) as well as Carl August von Steinheil (1837) used codes with varying word lengths for their telegraph systems. In 1841, Cooke and Wheatstone built a telegraph that printed the letters from a wheel of typefaces struck by a hammer.

=== Samuel Morse and Alfred Vail ===
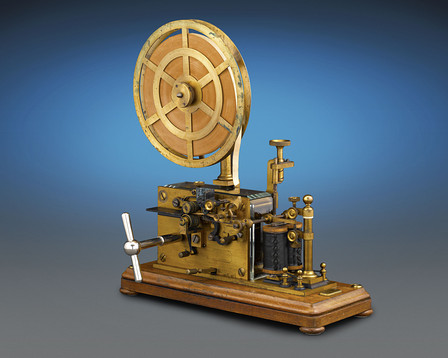
Morse code receiver that records on paper tape

The American artist Samuel Morse, the American physicist Joseph Henry, and mechanical engineer Alfred Vail developed an electrical telegraph system. The simple "on or off" nature of its signals made it desirable to find a method of transmitting natural language using only electrical pulses and the silence between them. Around 1837, Morse therefore developed such a method, an early forerunner to the modern International Morse code.

The Morse system for telegraphy was designed to make indentations on a paper tape when electric currents were received. Morse's original telegraph receiver used a mechanical clockwork to move a paper tape. When an electrical current was received, an electromagnet engaged an armature that pushed a stylus onto the moving paper tape, making an indentation on the tape. When the current was interrupted, a spring retracted the stylus and that portion of the moving tape remained unmarked.

In his earliest design for a code, Morse had planned to transmit only numerals, and to use a codebook to look up each word according to the number which had been sent. However, the code was soon expanded by Alfred Vail in 1840 to include letters and special characters, so it could be used more generally. Vail estimated the English language letter frequency by counting the movable type he found in the type cases of a local newspaper in Morristown, New Jersey. The shorter marks were called "dots" and the longer ones "dashes", and the letters most commonly used were assigned the shortest sequences of dots and dashes. This code, first used in 1844, was what later became known as Morse landline code, American Morse code, or Railroad Morse; railroads in the U.S. had largely phased out Morse telegraphy by the mid-1950s, although a few lines remained in use while trained operators were still available.

=== Operator-led change from graphical to audible code ===
In the original Morse telegraph system, the receiver's armature made a clicking noise as it moved in and out of position to mark the paper tape. Early telegraph operators soon learned that they could translate the clicks directly into dots and dashes, and write these down by hand, thus making the paper tape unnecessary. When Morse code was adapted to radio communication, the dots and dashes were sent as short and long tone pulses.

Later telegraphy training found that people become more proficient at receiving Morse code when it is taught "like a language", with each code perceived as a whole "word" instead of a sequence of separate dots and dashes, such as might be shown on a page.

With the advent of tones produced by radiotelegraph receivers, the operators began to vocalize a dot as dit, and a dash as dah, to reflect the sounds of Morse code they heard. To conform to normal sending speed, dits which are not the last element of a code became voiced as di. For example, the letter L, ▄ ▄▄▄ ▄ ▄ , is voiced as di dah di dit. Morse code was sometimes facetiously known as "iddy-umpty", a dit lampooned as "iddy" and a dah as "umpty", leading to the word "umpteen".

=== Gerke's refinement of Morse's code ===
Comparison of historical versions of Morse code with the current standard. Left: Later American Morse code from 1844. Center: The modified and rationalized version used by Friedrich Gerke on German railways. Right: Current ITU standard.

The Morse code, as specified in the current international standard, International Morse Code Recommendation, ITU-R M.1677-1, was derived from a much-improved proposal by Friedrich Gerke in 1848 that became known as the "Hamburg alphabet", its only real defect being the use of an excessively long code ( ▄ ▄▄▄ ▄ ▄ ▄ and later the equal duration code ▄▄▄ ▄▄▄ ▄▄▄ ) for the frequently used vowel O.

Gerke changed many of the codepoints, in the process doing away with the different length dashes and different inter-element spaces of American Morse, leaving only two coding elements, the dot and the dash. Codes for German umlauted vowels and CH were introduced. Gerke's code was adopted in Germany and Austria in 1851.

This finally led to the International Morse code in 1865. The International Morse code adopted most of Gerke's codepoints. The codes for O and P were taken from a code system developed by Steinheil. A new codepoint was added for J since Gerke did not distinguish between I and J. Changes were also made to X, Y, and Z. The codes for the digits 0–9 in International Morse were completely revised from both Vail's original and Gerke's revised encodings. This left only four codes identical to the original Morse code, namely E, H, K, and N; and K and N had their original short dahs extended to full length.

=== Radiotelegraphy and aviation ===
In the 1890s, Morse code began to be used extensively for early radio communication before it was possible to transmit voice. In the late 19th and early 20th centuries, most high-speed international communication used Morse code on telegraph lines, undersea cables, and radio circuits.

Although previous transmitters were bulky and the spark gap system of transmission was dangerous and difficult to use, there had been some early attempts: In 1910, the U.S. Navy experimented with sending Morse from an airplane. However the first regular aviation radiotelegraphy was on airships, which had space to accommodate the large, heavy radio equipment then in use. The same year, 1910, a radio on the airship America was instrumental in coordinating the rescue of its crew.

During World War I, Zeppelin airships equipped with radio were used for bombing and naval scouting, and ground-based radio direction finders were used for airship navigation. Allied airships and military aircraft also made some use of radiotelegraphy.

However, there was little aeronautical radio in general use during World War I, and in the 1920s, there was no radio system used by such important flights as that of Charles Lindbergh from New York to Paris in 1927. Once he and the Spirit of St. Louis were off the ground, Lindbergh was truly incommunicado and alone. Morse code in aviation began regular use in the mid-1920s. By 1928, when the first airplane flight was made by the Southern Cross from California to Australia, one of its four crewmen was a radio operator who communicated with ground stations via radio telegraph.

Beginning in the 1930s, both civilian and military pilots were required to be able to use Morse code, both for use with early communications systems and for identification of navigational beacons that transmitted continuous two- or three-letter identifiers in Morse code. Aeronautical charts show the identifier of each navigational aid next to its location on the map.

In addition, rapidly moving field armies could not have fought effectively without radiotelegraphy; they moved more quickly than their communications services could put up new telegraph and telephone lines. This was seen especially in the blitzkrieg offensives of the Nazi German Wehrmacht in Poland, Belgium, France (in 1940), the Soviet Union, and in North Africa; by the British Army in North Africa, Italy, and the Netherlands; and by the U.S. Army in France and Belgium (in 1944), and in southern Germany in 1945.

=== Maritime flash telegraphy and radio telegraphy ===
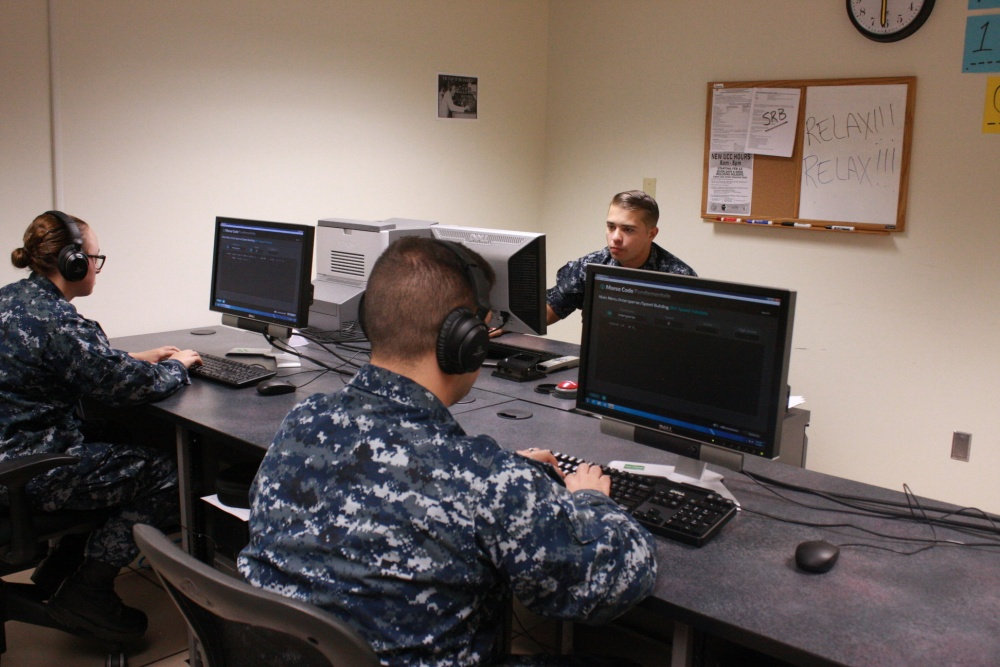
A U.S. Navy Morse code training class in 2015. The sailors will use their new skills to collect signals intelligence.

Navies have used signal lamps to communicate for more than 200 years. The advent of radio offered longer range, but allowed ships to be detected and tracked by radio direction finding. Even in the twenty-first century, signal lamps were used in special circumstances, such as replenishment at sea while maintaining radio silence. As of 2017, the U.S. Navy was experimenting with automated signalling with lights. Radiotelegraphy using Morse code was vital during World War II, especially in carrying messages between the warships and the naval bases of the belligerents. Long-range ship-to-ship communication was by radio telegraphy, using encrypted messages because the voice radio systems on ships then were quite limited in both their range and their security. Radiotelegraphy was also extensively used by warplanes, especially by long-range patrol planes that were sent out by navies to scout for enemy warships, cargo ships, and troop ships.

Morse code was used as an international standard for maritime distress until 1999 when it was replaced by the Global Maritime Distress and Safety System. When the French Navy ceased using Morse code on 31 January 1997, the final message transmitted was "Calling all. This is our last call before our eternal silence."

=== Demise of commercial telegraphy ===
In the United States the final commercial Morse code transmission was on 12 July 1999, signing off with Samuel Morse's original 1844 message, What hath God wrought, and the prosign S̅K̅ ("end of contact").

=== Continuing use of Morse code ===
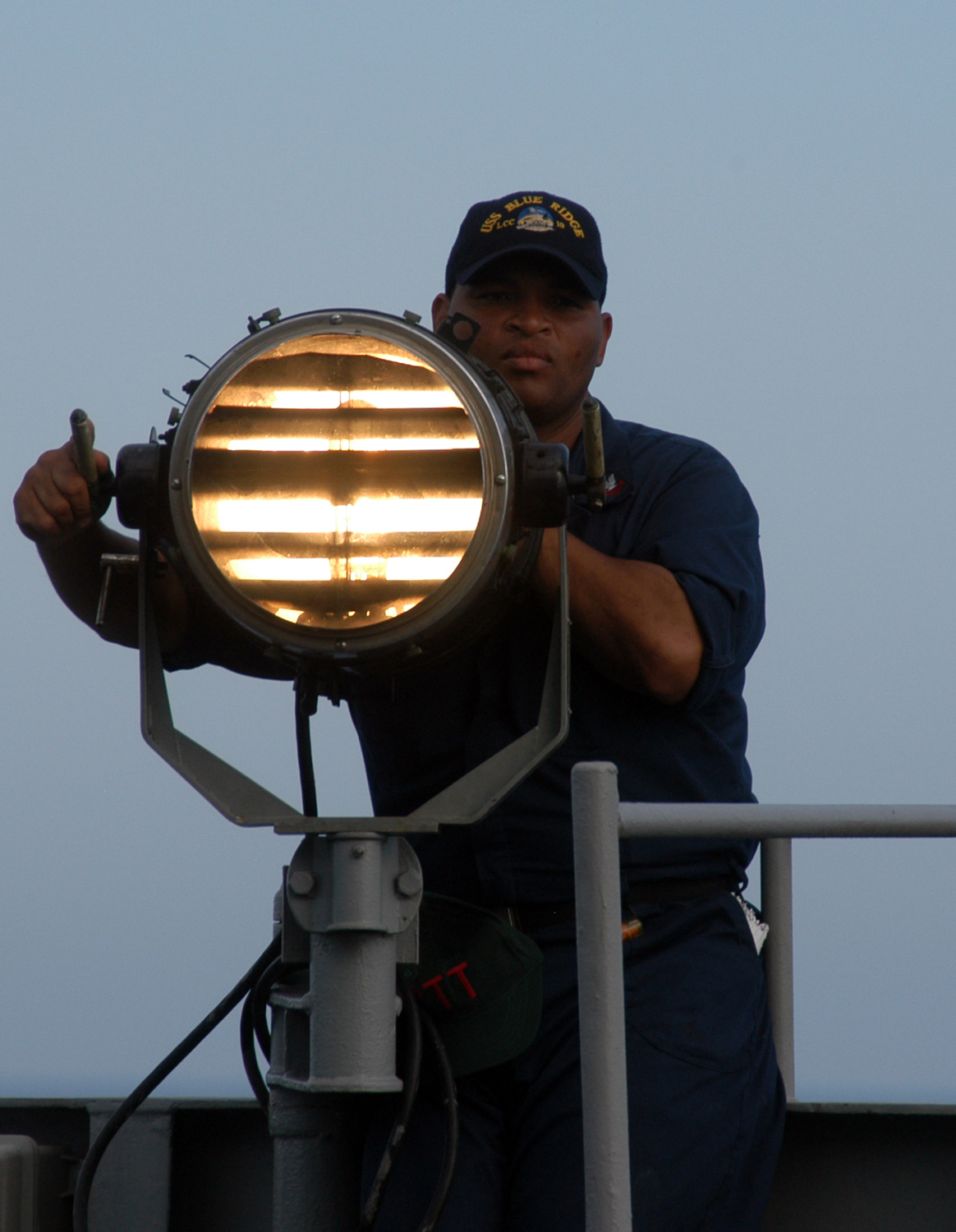
A U.S. Navy signalman sends Morse code signals in 2005.

As of 2015, the United States Air Force was still training ten people a year in Morse. As of the end of 2025, the Australian Defence Force was similarly continuing to teach Morse. In the Royal Australian Navy, Morse was still regarded as crucial, for example during very close quarters replenishment at sea, when it is transmitted by signal flags so as to avoid the use of radio transmitters while fuel is being transferred between ships.

The United States Coast Guard has ceased all use of Morse code on the radio, and no longer monitors any radio frequencies for Morse code transmissions, including the international medium frequency (MF) distress frequency of 500 kHz. However, the Federal Communications Commission still grants commercial radiotelegraph operator licenses to applicants who pass its code and written tests.

Meanwhile, licensees have reactivated the old California coastal Morse station KPH and regularly transmit from the site under either that call sign or as KSM. Similarly, a few U.S. museum ship stations are operated by Morse enthusiasts.

Internationally, The CW Operators' Club (CWops), has been established for amateur radio operators who use Morse code. At the end of 2025, the club's ambassador for Oceania estimated that the 12,000 amateur radio users in Australia included 700 practitioners of Morse, with 300 of them being regular users of the code. He said that a user committed to regular practice could become reasonably competent in Morse within about three to four months.

== Operator proficiency ==
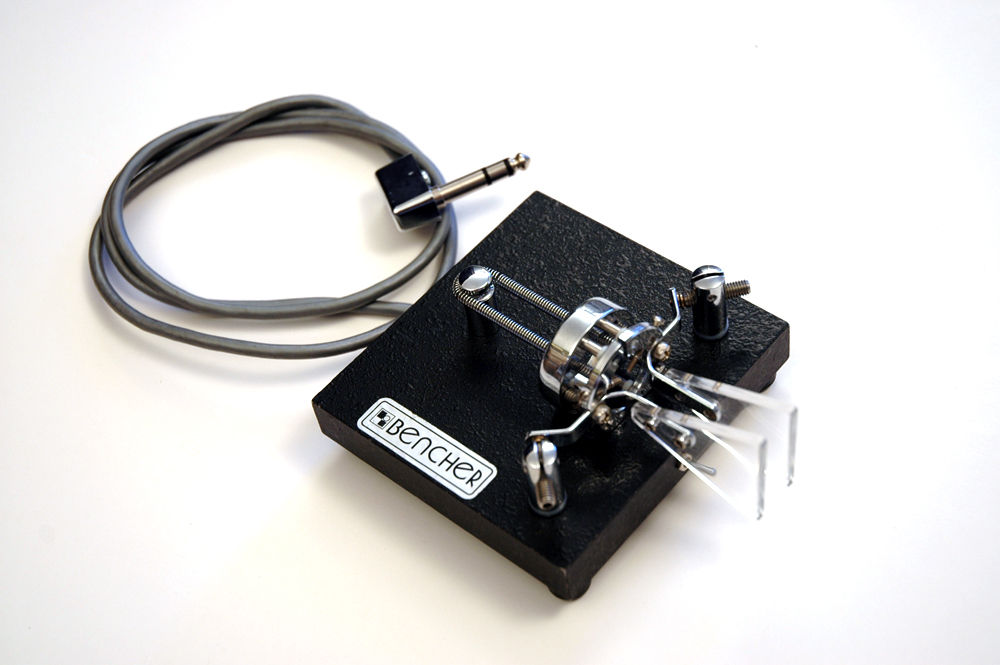
A commercially manufactured iambic paddle used in conjunction with an electronic keyer to generate high-speed Morse code, the timing of which is controlled by the keyer.

Morse code speed is measured in words per minute (WPM) or characters per minute (CPM). Characters have differing lengths because they contain differing numbers of dits and dahs. Consequently, words also have different lengths in terms of dot duration, even when they contain the same number of characters. For this reason, some standard word is adopted for measuring operators' transmission speeds: Two such standard words in common use are PARIS and CODEX. Operators skilled in Morse code can often understand ("copy") code in their minds at rates in excess of 40 WPM.

In addition to copying letters, numbers, and punctuation at high speeds, proficient operators must also interpret Morse code prosigns, which convey procedural information during communication.

International contests in code copying are still occasionally held. In July 1939 at a contest in Asheville, North Carolina in the United States, Theodore Roosevelt McElroy (W1JYN) set a still-standing record for Morse copying, 75.2 WPM. Pierpont (2004) also notes that some operators may have passed 100 WPM. By this time, they are "hearing" phrases and sentences rather than words. The fastest speed ever sent by a straight key was achieved in 1942 by Harry Turner (W9YZE) (d. 1992) who reached 35 WPM in a demonstration at a U.S. Army base. To accurately compare code copying speed records of different eras it is useful to keep in mind that different standard words (50 dit durations versus 60 dit durations) and different interword gaps (5 dit durations versus 7 dit durations) may have been used when determining such speed records. For example, speeds run with the CODEX standard word and the PARIS standard may differ by up to 20%.

Today among amateur operators there are several organizations that recognize high-speed code ability, one group consisting of those who can copy Morse at 60 WPM. Also, Certificates of Code Proficiency are issued by several amateur radio societies, including the American Radio Relay League. Their basic award starts at 10 WPM with endorsements as high as 40 WPM, and are available to anyone who can copy the transmitted text. Members of the Boy Scouts of America may put a Morse interpreter's strip on their uniforms if they meet the standards for translating code at 5 WPM.

Through May 2013, the First, Second, and Third Class (commercial) Radiotelegraph Licenses using code tests based upon the CODEX standard word were still being issued in the United States by the Federal Communications Commission. The First Class license required 20 WPM code group and 25 WPM text code proficiency, the others 16 WPM code group test (five letter blocks sent as simulation of receiving encrypted text) and 20 WPM code text (plain language) test. It was also necessary to pass written tests on operating practice and electronics theory. A unique additional demand for the First Class was a requirement of a year of experience for operators of shipboard and coast stations using Morse. This allowed the holder to be chief operator on board a passenger ship. However, since 1999 the use of satellite and very high-frequency maritime communications systems (GMDSS) has made them obsolete. (By that point meeting experience requirement for the First was very difficult.)

Currently, only one class of license, the Radiotelegraph Operator License, is issued. This is granted either when the tests are passed or as the Second and First are renewed and become this lifetime license. For new applicants, it requires passing a written examination on electronic theory and radiotelegraphy practices, as well as 16 WPM code-group and 20 WPM text tests. However, the code exams are currently waived for holders of Amateur Extra Class licenses who obtained their operating privileges under the old 20 WPM test requirement.

== International Morse code ==
Morse codes of one version or another have been in use for more than 160 years — longer than any other electrical message encoding system. What is today called "Morse code" is different from what was originally actually developed by Vail and Morse. The Modern International Morse code, or continental code, was created by Friedrich Clemens Gerke in 1848 and initially used for telegraphy between Hamburg and Cuxhaven in Germany. Gerke changed nearly half of the alphabet and all of the numerals, providing the foundation for the modern form of the code. After some minor changes to the letters and a complete revision of the numerals, International Morse code was standardized by the International Telegraph Convention on the third and final session of the conference that took place on 17 May 1865 in Paris. This formed the International Telegraph Union – the precursor of today’s (International Telecommunication Union) ITU, which still maintains it as the international standard. Morse and Vail's final code specification, however, was only really used for land-line telegraphy in the United States and Canada, with the International code used everywhere else, including all ships at sea and sailing in North American waters. Vail's version became known as American Morse code or railroad code, and is now almost never used, with the possible exception of historical re-enactments.

=== Aviation ===
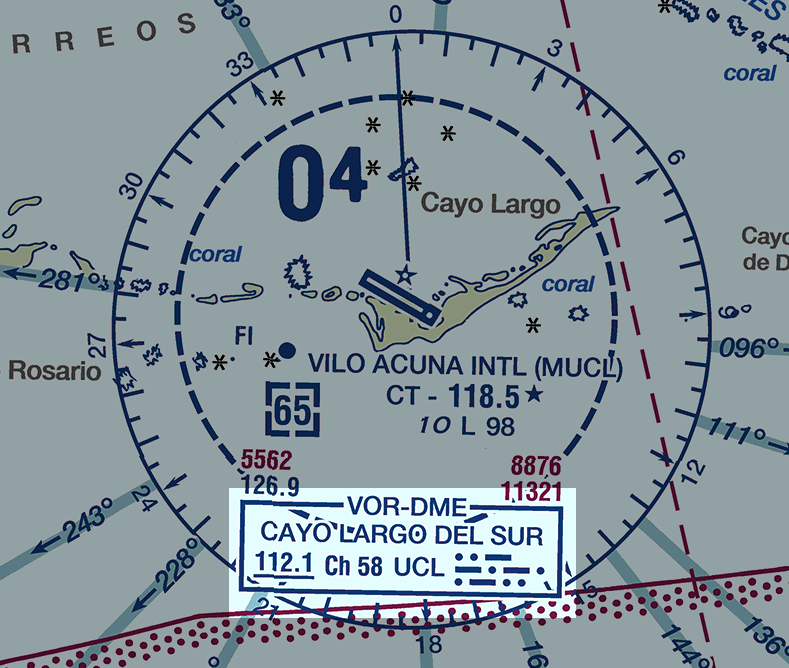
Cayo Largo del Sur VOR-DME

In aviation, pilots use radio navigation aids. To allow pilots to ensure that the stations they intend to use are serviceable, the stations transmit a set of identification letters (usually a two-to-five-letter version of the station name) in Morse code. Station identification letters are shown on air navigation charts. For example, the VOR-DME based at Vilo Acuña Airport in Cayo Largo del Sur, Cuba is identified by "UCL", and Morse code UCL is repeatedly transmitted on its radio frequency.

In some countries, during periods of maintenance, the facility may instead transmit the signal TEST ( ▄▄▄ ▄ ▄ ▄ ▄ ▄▄▄ ), or the identification may be removed, which tells pilots and navigators that the station is unreliable. In Canada, the identification is removed entirely to signify the navigation aid is not to be used.

In the aviation service, Morse is typically sent at a very slow speed of about 5 WPM. In the U.S., pilots do not actually have to know Morse to identify the transmitter because the dot/dash sequence is written out next to the transmitter's symbol on aeronautical charts. Some modern navigation receivers automatically translate the code into displayed letters.

The sound of non-directional beacon WG, on 248 kHz, located at 49.8992 North, 97.349197 West, near Winnipeg's main airport

=== Amateur radio ===
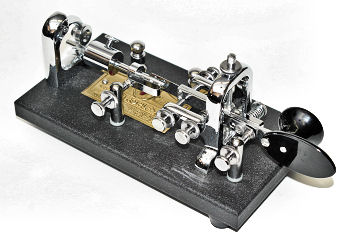
Vibroplex brand semiautomatic key (informally called a "bug")

International Morse code today is most popular among amateur radio operators, in "continuous wave" mode (distinguished from the older and now-banned spark gap mode). Other, faster keying methods are available in radio telegraphy, such as frequency-shift keying (FSK).

The original amateur radio operators used Morse code exclusively since voice-capable radio transmitters did not become commonly available until around 1920. Until 2003, the International Telecommunication Union mandated Morse code proficiency as part of the amateur radio licensing procedure worldwide. However, the World Radiocommunication Conference of 2003 made the Morse code requirement for amateur radio licensing optional. Many countries subsequently removed the Morse requirement from their license requirements.

Morse code recorded on the 40 meter ham radio band (31 sec)

Until 1991, a demonstration of the ability to send and receive Morse code at a minimum of 5 WPM was required to receive an amateur radio license for use in the United States from the Federal Communications Commission. Demonstration of this ability was still required for the privilege to use the shortwave bands. Until 2000, proficiency at the 20 WPM level was required to receive the highest level of amateur license (Amateur Extra Class); effective April 15, 2000, the FCC reduced the Extra Class requirement to 5 WPM. Finally, effective on February 23, 2007, the FCC eliminated the Morse code proficiency requirements from all amateur radio licenses.

While voice and data transmissions are limited to specific amateur radio bands under U.S. rules, Morse code is permitted on all amateur bands: LF, MF low, MF high, HF, VHF, and UHF. In some countries, certain portions of the amateur radio bands are reserved for transmission of Morse code signals only.

Because Morse code transmissions employ an on-off keyed radio signal, it requires less complex equipment than other radio transmission modes. Morse code also uses less bandwidth (typically only 100–150 Hz wide, although only for a slow data rate) than voice communication (roughly 2,400~2,800 Hz used by SSB voice).

Morse code is usually received as a high-pitched audio tone, so transmissions are easier to copy than voice through the noise on congested frequencies, and it can be used in very high noise / low signal environments. The fact that the transmitted power is concentrated into a very limited bandwidth makes it possible to use narrow receiver filters, which suppress or eliminate interference on nearby frequencies. The narrow signal bandwidth also takes advantage of the natural aural selectivity of the human brain, further enhancing weak signal readability. This efficiency makes CW extremely useful for DX (long distance) transmissions, as well as for low-power transmissions (commonly called "QRP operation", from the Q-code for "reduce power"). There are several amateur clubs that require solid high speed copy, the highest of these has a standard of 60 WPM. The American Radio Relay League offers a code proficiency certification program that starts at 10 WPM.

The relatively limited speed at which Morse code can be sent led to the development of an extensive number of abbreviations to speed communication. These include prosigns, Q codes, and a set of Morse code abbreviations for typical message components. For example, CQ is broadcast to be interpreted as "seek you" (I'd like to converse with anyone who can hear my signal). The abbreviations OM (old man), YL (young lady), and XYL ("ex-young lady" – wife) are common. YL or OM is used by an operator when referring to the other operator (regardless of their actual age), and XYL or OM (rather than the expected XYM) is used by an operator when referring to his or her spouse. QTH is "transmitting location" (spoken "my Q.T.H." is "my location"). The use of abbreviations for common terms permits conversation even when the operators speak different languages.

Although the traditional telegraph key (straight key) is still used by some amateurs, the use of mechanical semi-automatic keyers (informally called "bugs"), and of fully automatic electronic keyers (called "single paddle" and either "double-paddle" or "iambic" keys) is prevalent today. Software is also frequently employed to produce and decode Morse code radio signals. The ARRL has a readability standard for robot encoders called ARRL Farnsworth spacing that is supposed to have higher readability for both robot and human decoders.

=== Other uses ===
Radio navigation aids such as VORs and NDBs for aeronautical use broadcast identifying information in the form of Morse code, though many VOR stations now also provide voice identification. Warships, including those of the U.S. Navy, have long used signal lamps to exchange messages in Morse code. Modern use continues, in part, as a way to communicate while maintaining radio silence.

Automatic Transmitter Identification System (ATIS) uses Morse code to identify uplink sources of analog satellite transmissions.

Many amateur radio repeaters identify with Morse, even though they are used for voice communications.

=== Applications for the general public ===
Representation of Morse code S̅O̅S̅

An important application is signalling for help through SOS, " ▄ ▄ ▄ ▄▄▄ ▄▄▄ ▄▄▄ ▄ ▄ ▄ ". This can be sent many ways: keying a radio on and off, flashing a mirror, toggling a flashlight, and similar methods. The SOS signal is not sent as three separate characters; rather, it is a prosign S̅O̅S̅, and is keyed without gaps between characters. The specific meaning of the S̅O̅S̅ prosign is equivalent to "This is the start of a distress message" (all other transmissions to go silent for the duration of the message).

=== Morse code as an assistive technology ===
Morse code has been employed as an assistive technology, helping people with a variety of disabilities to communicate. For example, the Android operating system versions 5.0 and higher allow users to input text using Morse code as an alternative to a keypad or handwriting recognition. These devices may to some degree need to be adapted to specific mobility capabilities.

For people with severe disabilities, both one- and two-switch Morse can be difficult because both depend, to some extent, on timing. ... access products can also offer "three-switch Morse". In three-switch Morse code, one switch signals dit, while another signals dah, just like two-switch Morse. But a third switch is used to indicate that the letter is complete. This removes the necessity of timing to send Morse code.

— D.K. Anson (2018)

Morse can be sent by persons with severe motion disabilities, as long as they have some minimal motor control. An original solution to the problem that caretakers have to learn to decode has been an electronic typewriter with the codes written on the keys. Codes were sung by users; see the voice typewriter employing Morse or votem.

Morse code can also be translated by computer and used in a speaking communication aid. In some cases, this means alternately blowing into and sucking on a plastic tube ("sip-and-puff" interface). An important advantage of Morse code over row column scanning is that once learned, it does not require looking at a display. Also, it appears faster than scanning.

In one case reported in the radio amateur magazine QST, an old shipboard radio operator who had a stroke and lost the ability to speak or write could communicate with his physician (a radio amateur) by blinking his eyes in Morse. Two examples of communication in intensive care units were also published in QST magazine. Another example occurred in 1966 when prisoner of war Jeremiah Denton, brought on television by his North Vietnamese captors, Morse-blinked the word TORTURE. In these two cases, interpreters were available to understand those series of eye-blinks.

== Representation, timing, and speeds ==
A sample Morse code transmission
The text "Welcome to Wikipedia, the free encyclopedia that anyone can edit." sent as Morse code at 13 WPM.

Morse code A–Z
A B C D E F G H I J K L M N O P Q R S T U V W X Y Z in Morse code at 8 WPM.

International Morse code is composed of five elements:

1. short mark, dot or dit ( ▄ ): "dit duration" is one time unit long
2. long mark, dash or dah ( ▄▄▄ ): three time units long
3. inter-element gap between the dits or dahs within a single character: one dit duration silence, one unit long
4. short gap (between letters): one dah duration silence, three time units long
5. medium gap (between words): a long silence, duration the same as two (silent) dahs sent with a normal one dit gap, seven time units (formerly five)

Note that the two mark signals, the dit and dah, are an odd number of dits long (1 or 3), and the gaps or spaces that always follow them are also odd numbers of dits (1, 3, or 7). Because of that, any code in ITU International Morse always comes out to an even number of dits when both the mark and space timing of the whole symbol are counted. That makes ITU Morse have a two-dit-long staccato beat, which helps telegraphers keep their transmit rate steady.

=== Transmission ===
Morse code can be transmitted in a number of ways: Originally as electrical pulses along a telegraph wire, but later extended to an audio tone, a radio signal with short and long tones, or high and low tones, or as a mechanical, audible, or visual signal (e.g. a flashing light) using devices like an Aldis lamp or a heliograph, a common flashlight, or even a car horn. Some mine rescues have used pulling on a rope - a short pull for a dot and a long pull for a dah. Ground forces send messages to aircraft with panel signalling, where a horizontal panel is a dah and a vertical panel a dit.

Morse messages are generally transmitted by a hand-operated device such as a telegraph key, so there are variations introduced by the skill of the sender and receiver — more experienced operators can send and receive at faster speeds. In addition, individual operators differ slightly, for example, using slightly longer or shorter dahs or gaps, perhaps only for particular characters. This is called their "fist", and experienced operators can recognize specific individuals by it alone. A good operator who sends clearly and is easy to copy is said to have a "good fist". A "poor fist" is a characteristic of sloppy or hard to copy Morse code.

==== Digital storage ====
Morse code is transmitted using just two states (on and off). Morse code may be represented as a binary code, and that is what telegraph operators do when transmitting messages. Working from the above ITU definition and further defining a bit as a dot time, a Morse code sequence may be crudely represented a combination of the following five bit-strings:

1. short mark, dot or dit ( ▄ ): '1'b
2. longer mark, dash or dah ( ▄▄▄ ): '111'b
3. intra-character gap (between the dits and dahs within a character): 0
4. short gap (between letters): '000'b
5. medium gap (between words): '0000000'b

The marks and gaps alternate: Dits and dahs are always separated by one of the gaps, and that the gaps are always separated by a dit or a dah.

A more efficient binary encoding uses only two-bits for each dit or dah element, with the 1 dit-length pause that must follow after each automatically included for every 2 bit code. One possible coding is by number value for the length of signal tone sent one could use '01'b for a dit and the automatic single-dit pause after it, and '11'b for a dah and the automatic single-dit following pause, and '00'b for the extra pause between letters (in effect, an end-of-letter mark). That leaves the code '10'b available for some other purpose, such as an escape character, or to more compactly represent the extra space between words (an end-of-word mark) instead of '00 00 00'b (only 6 dit lengths, since the 7th is automatically inserted as part of the prior dit or dah).

Although the dit and inter-letter pauses work out to be the same, for any letter containing a dah, the two-bit encoding uses digital memory more compactly than the direct-conversion bit strings mentioned above. Including the letter-separating spaces, all International Morse letter codes pack into 12 bits or less (5 symbols), and most fit into 10 bits or less (4 symbols); most of the procedural signs fit into 14 bits, with a few only needing 12 bits (5 symbols); and all digits require exactly 12 bits.

For example, Morse g ( ▄▄▄ ▄▄▄ ▄ + 2 extra empty dits for "end of letter") would binary-encode as '11'b, '11'b, '01'b, '00'b; when packed it is '1111 0100'b = 'F4'x, which stores into only one byte (two nibbles) (as does every three-element code). The bit encoding for the longer method mentioned earlier the same letter would encode as '1110'b, '1110'b, '1000'b = '1110 1110 1000'b = 'EE8'x, or one-and-a-half bytes (three nibbles). The space saving allows small devices, like portable memory keyers, to have more and longer International Morse code sequences in small, conventional device-driver microprocessors' RAM chips.

=== Cable code ===
The very long time constants of 19th and early 20th century submarine communications cables required a different form of Morse signalling. Instead of keying a voltage on and off for varying times, the dits and dahs were represented by two polarities of voltage impressed on the cable, for a uniform time.

=== Timing ===
Below is an illustration of timing conventions. The phrase MORSE CODE, in Morse code format, would normally be written something like this, where ▄▄▄ represents dahs and ▄ represents dits:

M	O	R	S	E	C	O	D	E
▄▄▄ ▄▄▄	▄▄▄ ▄▄▄ ▄▄▄	▄ ▄▄▄ ▄	▄ ▄ ▄	▄	▄▄▄ ▄ ▄▄▄ ▄	▄▄▄ ▄▄▄ ▄▄▄	▄▄▄ ▄ ▄	▄

Next is the exact conventional timing for this phrase, with ▓ representing "signal on", and ˽ representing "signal off", each for the time length of exactly one dit:

M		O		R		S		E		C		O		D		E
▓▓▓˽▓▓▓	˽˽˽	▓▓▓˽▓▓▓˽▓▓▓	˽˽˽	▓˽▓▓▓˽▓	˽˽˽	▓˽▓˽▓	˽˽˽	▓	˽˽˽˽˽˽˽	▓▓▓˽▓˽▓▓▓˽▓	˽˽˽	▓▓▓˽▓▓▓˽▓▓▓	˽˽˽	▓▓▓˽▓˽▓	˽˽˽	▓
↑		↑		↑	↑				↑
_{symbol}		_{dah}		_{dit}	_{letter}				_{word}
^{space}					^{space}				^{space}

=== Spoken representation ===
Morse code is often spoken or written with dah for dashes, dit for dots located at the end of a character, and di for dots located at the beginning or internally within the character. Thus, the following Morse code sequence:

▄▄▄ ▄▄▄	▄▄▄ ▄▄▄ ▄▄▄	▄ ▄▄▄ ▄	▄ ▄ ▄	▄	▄▄▄ ▄ ▄▄▄ ▄	▄▄▄ ▄▄▄ ▄▄▄	▄▄▄ ▄ ▄	▄
M	O	R	S	E	C	O	D	E

is spoken (or sung):

dah dah	dah dah dah	di dah dit	di di dit	dit	dah di dah dit	dah dah dah	dah di dit	dit
▄▄▄ ▄▄▄	▄▄▄ ▄▄▄ ▄▄▄	▄ ▄▄▄ ▄	▄ ▄ ▄	▄	▄▄▄ ▄ ▄▄▄ ▄	▄▄▄ ▄▄▄ ▄▄▄	▄▄▄ ▄ ▄	▄
M	O	R	S	E	C	O	D	E

For use on radio, there is little point in learning to read Morse written in dashes and dots, as above; rather, the sounds of all of the letters and symbols need to be learned, for both sending and receiving.

=== Speed in words per minute ===
All Morse code elements depend on the dot / dit length. A dah is the length of 3 dits (with no gaps between), and spacings are specified in number of dit lengths. An unambiguous method of specifying the transmission speed is to specify the dit duration as, for example, 50 milliseconds.

Specifying the dit duration is, however, not the common practice. Morse code transmission rate is typically specified in groups per minute, commonly referred to as words per minute. The time needed to transmit the word paris is typically the standard "word" for calculating the "word per minute" rate. Standards using other "words" such as codex are also seen occasionally, so a reported rate may be ambiguous if this is not specified.

PARIS mimics a word rate that is typical of natural language words and reflects the benefits of Morse code's shorter code durations for common characters such as E and T. CODEX offers a word rate that is typical of 5 letter code groups (sequences of random letters). Using the word PARIS as a standard, the number of dit units is 50 and a simple calculation shows that the dit length at 20 WPM is 60 milliseconds. Using the word CODEX with 60 dit units, the dit length at 20 WPM is 50 milliseconds.

Because Morse code is usually sent by hand, it is unlikely that an operator could be that precise with the dit length, and the individual characteristics and preferences of the operators usually override the standards.

For commercial radiotelegraph licenses in the United States, the Federal Communications Commission specifies tests for Morse code proficiency in words per minute and in code groups per minute. The FCC specifies that a "word" is 5 characters long. The Commission specifies Morse code test elements at 16 code groups per minute, 20 words per minute, 20 code groups per minute, and 25 words per minute. The word per minute rate would be close to the PARIS standard, and the code groups per minute would be close to the CODEX standard.

While the Federal Communications Commission no longer requires Morse code for amateur radio licenses, the old requirements were similar to the requirements for commercial radiotelegraph licenses.

A difference between amateur radio licenses and commercial radiotelegraph licenses is that commercial operators must be able to receive code groups of random characters along with plain language text. For each class of license, the code group speed requirement is slower than the plain language text requirement. For example, for the Radiotelegraph Operator License, the examinee must pass a 20 word per minute plain text test and a 16 word per minute code group test.

Based upon a 50 dit duration standard word such as PARIS, the time for one dit duration or one unit can be computed by the formula:

T = 1200 / W

where: T is the unit time, or dit duration in milliseconds, and W is the speed in WPM.

High-speed telegraphy contests are held; according to the Guinness Book of Records in June 2005 at the International Amateur Radio Union's 6th World Championship in High Speed Telegraphy in Primorsko, Bulgaria, Andrei Bindasov of Belarus transmitted 230 Morse code marks of mixed text in one minute.

=== Farnsworth speed ===
Sometimes, especially while teaching Morse code, the timing rules above are changed so two different speeds are used: A character speed and a text speed. The character speed is how fast each individual letter is sent. The text speed is how fast the entire message is sent. For example, individual characters may be sent at a 13 words-per-minute rate, but the intercharacter and interword gaps may be lengthened so the word rate is only 5 WPM.

Using different character and text speeds is, in fact, a common practice, and is used in the Farnsworth method of learning Morse code.

=== Alternative display of common characters in International Morse code ===
Some methods of teaching Morse code use a dichotomic search table.

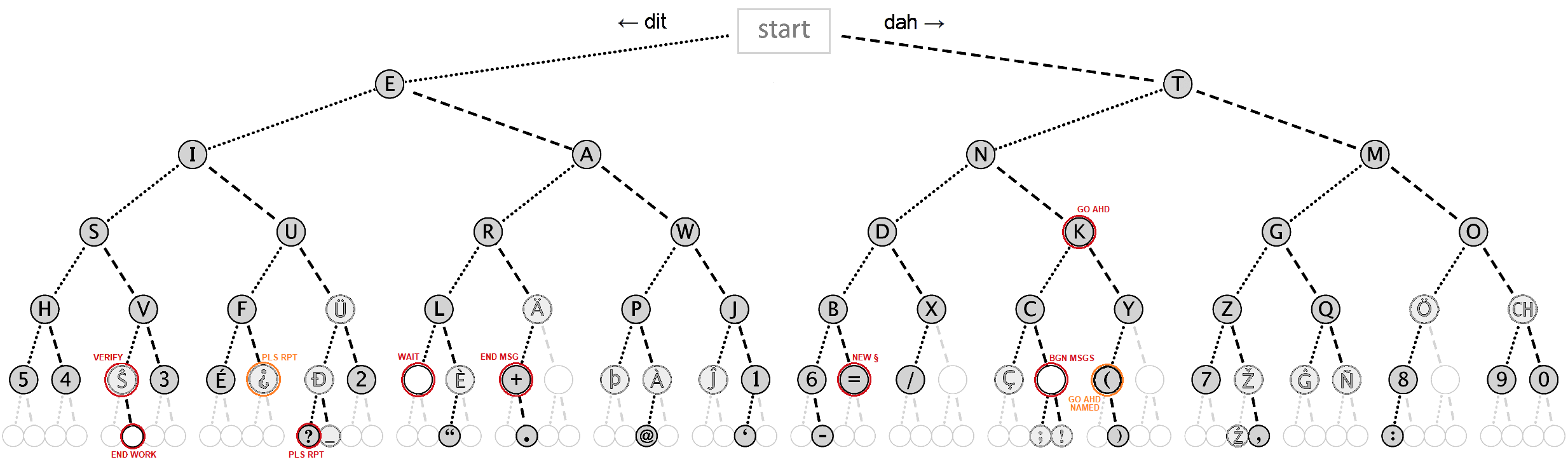
International Morse code binary search tree: The graph branches left for each dit and right for each dah until the character representation is reached. Official ITU codes are shown as black letters on dark grey, and are complete, including punctuation; a few non-ITU extensions are shown in outline-font on light grey, but many others are left out. ITU prosigns are circled in red with red text and are complete; unofficial prosigns are orange and are mostly complete.

== Learning methods ==
People learning Morse code using the Farnsworth method are taught to send and receive letters and other symbols at their full target speed, that is with normal relative timing of the dits, dahs, and spaces within each symbol for that speed. The Farnsworth method is named for Donald R. "Russ" Farnsworth, also known by his call sign, W6TTB. However, initially exaggerated spaces between symbols and words are used, to give "thinking time" to make the sound "shape" of the letters and symbols easier to learn. The spacing can then be reduced with practice and familiarity.

Another popular teaching method is the Koch method, published in 1936 by the German engineer and former Nazi stormtrooper Ludwig Koch, which uses the full target speed from the outset but begins with just two characters. Once strings containing those two characters can be copied with 90% accuracy, an additional character is added, and so on until the full character set is mastered.

In North America, many thousands of individuals have increased their code recognition speed (after initial memorization of the characters) by listening to the regularly scheduled code practice transmissions broadcast by W1AW, the station at the American Radio Relay League's headquarters or by listening to the archived recordings available at its website. As of 2015, the United States military taught Morse code as an 81 day self-paced course, having phased out more traditional classes.

=== Mnemonics ===
Scout movement founder Baden-Powell's mnemonic chart from 1918

Visual mnemonic charts have been devised over the ages. Baden-Powell included one in the Girl Guides handbook in 1918.

In the United Kingdom, many people learned the Morse code by means of a series of words or phrases that have the same rhythm as a Morse character. For instance, Q in Morse is dah dah di dah , which can be memorized by the phrase "God Save the Queen", and the Morse for F is di di dah dit , which can be memorized as "Did she like it?"

A well-known Morse code rhythm from the Second World War period derives from Beethoven's Fifth Symphony, the opening phrase of which was regularly played at the beginning of BBC broadcasts. The timing of the notes corresponds to the Morse for V, di di di dah ( ▄ ▄ ▄ ▄▄▄ ), promoted by prime minister Churchill as "'V' for Victory".

== Characters and prosigns ==
Nonstandard punctuation, characters with diacritics, and non-Latin letters are not present in either ITU-R M.1172 or ITU-R M.1677-1, except for Ę, ę.

Category	Character	Code
Letters	A, a	▄ ▄▄▄
Letters	B, b	▄▄▄ ▄ ▄ ▄
Letters	C, c	▄▄▄ ▄ ▄▄▄ ▄
Letters	D, d	▄▄▄ ▄ ▄
Letters	E, e	▄
Letters	F, f	▄ ▄ ▄▄▄ ▄
Letters	G, g	▄▄▄ ▄▄▄ ▄
Letters	H, h	▄ ▄ ▄ ▄
Letters	I, i	▄ ▄
Letters	J, j	▄ ▄▄▄ ▄▄▄ ▄▄▄
Letters	K, k Prosign for general invitation to transmit	▄▄▄ ▄ ▄▄▄
Letters	L, l	▄ ▄▄▄ ▄ ▄
Letters	M, m	▄▄▄ ▄▄▄
Letters	N, n	▄▄▄ ▄
Letters	O, o	▄▄▄ ▄▄▄ ▄▄▄
Letters	P, p	▄ ▄▄▄ ▄▄▄ ▄
Letters	Q, q	▄▄▄ ▄▄▄ ▄ ▄▄▄
Letters	R, r	▄ ▄▄▄ ▄
Letters	S, s	▄ ▄ ▄
Letters	T, t	▄▄▄
Letters	U, u	▄ ▄ ▄▄▄
Letters	V, v	▄ ▄ ▄ ▄▄▄
Letters	W, w	▄ ▄▄▄ ▄▄▄
Letters	X, x	▄▄▄ ▄ ▄ ▄▄▄
Letters	Y, y	▄▄▄ ▄ ▄▄▄ ▄▄▄
Letters	Z, z	▄▄▄ ▄▄▄ ▄ ▄
Numbers	0	▄▄▄ ▄▄▄ ▄▄▄ ▄▄▄ ▄▄▄
Numbers	1	▄ ▄▄▄ ▄▄▄ ▄▄▄ ▄▄▄
Numbers	2	▄ ▄ ▄▄▄ ▄▄▄ ▄▄▄
Numbers	3	▄ ▄ ▄ ▄▄▄ ▄▄▄
Numbers	4	▄ ▄ ▄ ▄ ▄▄▄
Numbers	5	▄ ▄ ▄ ▄ ▄
Numbers	6	▄▄▄ ▄ ▄ ▄ ▄
Numbers	7	▄▄▄ ▄▄▄ ▄ ▄ ▄
Numbers	8	▄▄▄ ▄▄▄ ▄▄▄ ▄ ▄
Numbers	9	▄▄▄ ▄▄▄ ▄▄▄ ▄▄▄ ▄
Punctuation	Period [ . ] R̅K̅ digraph	▄ ▄▄▄ ▄ ▄▄▄ ▄ ▄▄▄
Punctuation	Comma [ , ] G̅W̅ digraph	▄▄▄ ▄▄▄ ▄ ▄ ▄▄▄ ▄▄▄
Punctuation	Question mark [ ? ] U̅D̅ digraph	▄ ▄ ▄▄▄ ▄▄▄ ▄ ▄
Punctuation	Apostrophe [ ' ], also used for minutes of arc and doubled for seconds of arc (''); W̅G̅ digraph	▄ ▄▄▄ ▄▄▄ ▄▄▄ ▄▄▄ ▄
Punctuation	Slash or fraction bar [ / ] D̅N̅ digraph	▄▄▄ ▄ ▄ ▄▄▄ ▄
Punctuation	Open parenthesis [ ( ] K̅N̅ digraph; unofficial prosign for exclusive invitation to transmit	▄▄▄ ▄ ▄▄▄ ▄▄▄ ▄
Punctuation	Close parenthesis [ ) ] K̅K̅ digraph	▄▄▄ ▄ ▄▄▄ ▄▄▄ ▄ ▄▄▄
Punctuation	Colon [ : ] O̅S̅ digraph	▄▄▄ ▄▄▄ ▄▄▄ ▄ ▄ ▄
Punctuation	Double dash [ = ] B̅T̅ digraph; prosign for new section or new paragraph	▄▄▄ ▄ ▄ ▄ ▄▄▄
Punctuation	Plus sign [ + ] R̅N̅ digraph; prosign for new message or new page	▄ ▄▄▄ ▄ ▄▄▄ ▄
Punctuation	Hyphen or Minus sign [ − ] D̅U̅	▄▄▄ ▄ ▄ ▄ ▄ ▄▄▄
Punctuation	Quotation mark [ " ] R̅R̅	▄ ▄▄▄ ▄ ▄ ▄▄▄ ▄
Punctuation	At sign [ @ ] A̅C̅ digraph	▄ ▄▄▄ ▄▄▄ ▄ ▄▄▄ ▄
Nonstandard punctuation	Exclamation mark, [ ! ] K̅W̅ digraph, alt. M̅N̅	▄▄▄ ▄ ▄▄▄ ▄ ▄▄▄ ▄▄▄ alt. ▄▄▄ ▄▄▄ ▄▄▄ ▄
Nonstandard punctuation	Ampersand [ & ] A̅S̅ digraph; prosign for wait	▄ ▄▄▄ ▄ ▄ ▄
Nonstandard punctuation	Semicolon [ ; ] K̅R̅	▄▄▄ ▄ ▄▄▄ ▄ ▄▄▄ ▄
Nonstandard punctuation	Underscore [ _ ] U̅K̅	▄ ▄ ▄▄▄ ▄▄▄ ▄ ▄▄▄
Nonstandard punctuation	Dollar sign [ $ ] S̅X̅ digraph	▄ ▄ ▄ ▄▄▄ ▄ ▄ ▄▄▄
Prosigns	End of work S̅K̅ digraph	▄ ▄ ▄ ▄▄▄ ▄ ▄▄▄
Prosigns	Error; H̅H̅ digraph	▄ ▄ ▄ ▄ ▄ ▄ ▄ ▄
Prosigns	General invitation to transmit Also used for letter 'K'	▄▄▄ ▄ ▄▄▄
Prosigns	Transmission start signal C̅T̅ digraph	▄▄▄ ▄ ▄▄▄ ▄ ▄▄▄
Prosigns	Next message follows R̅N̅ digraph; message or page separator. Sometimes represented as + in a single-line decoding display.	▄ ▄▄▄ ▄ ▄▄▄ ▄
Prosigns	Verified; S̅N̅ digraph; also used for letter Ŝ	▄ ▄ ▄ ▄▄▄ ▄
Prosigns	Wait; A̅S̅ digraph; proposed for use as ampersand [ & ]	▄ ▄▄▄ ▄ ▄ ▄
Diacritics and non-Latin extensions	À, à Code shared with Å	▄ ▄▄▄ ▄▄▄ ▄ ▄▄▄
Diacritics and non-Latin extensions	Ä, ä Code shared with Æ, Ą	▄ ▄▄▄ ▄ ▄▄▄
Diacritics and non-Latin extensions	Å, å Code shared with À	▄ ▄▄▄ ▄▄▄ ▄ ▄▄▄
Diacritics and non-Latin extensions	Ą, ą Code shared with Ä, Æ	▄ ▄▄▄ ▄ ▄▄▄
Diacritics and non-Latin extensions	Æ, æ Code shared with Ä, Ą	▄ ▄▄▄ ▄ ▄▄▄
Diacritics and non-Latin extensions	Ć, ć Code shared with Ĉ, Ç	▄▄▄ ▄ ▄▄▄ ▄ ▄
Diacritics and non-Latin extensions	Ĉ, ĉ Code shared with Ć, Ç	▄▄▄ ▄ ▄▄▄ ▄ ▄
Diacritics and non-Latin extensions	Ç, ç Code shared with Ć, Ĉ	▄▄▄ ▄ ▄▄▄ ▄ ▄
Diacritics and non-Latin extensions	CH, ch Code shared with Ĥ, Š	▄▄▄ ▄▄▄ ▄▄▄ ▄▄▄
Diacritics and non-Latin extensions	Đ, đ (D with stroke); Code shared with É, Ę; distinct from eth (Ð, ð)	▄ ▄ ▄▄▄ ▄ ▄
Diacritics and non-Latin extensions	Ð, ð ( Edh or eth); Distinct from D with stroke ( Đ, đ)	▄ ▄ ▄▄▄ ▄▄▄ ▄
Diacritics and non-Latin extensions	É, é Code shared with Đ ,Ę	▄ ▄ ▄▄▄ ▄ ▄
Diacritics and non-Latin extensions	È, è Code shared with Ł	▄ ▄▄▄ ▄ ▄ ▄▄▄
Diacritics and non-Latin extensions	Ę, ę Code shared with Đ, É	▄ ▄ ▄▄▄ ▄ ▄
Diacritics and non-Latin extensions	Ĝ, ĝ	▄▄▄ ▄▄▄ ▄ ▄▄▄ ▄
Diacritics and non-Latin extensions	Ĥ, ĥ Code shared with CH, Š	▄▄▄ ▄▄▄ ▄▄▄ ▄▄▄
Diacritics and non-Latin extensions	Ĵ, ĵ	▄ ▄▄▄ ▄▄▄ ▄▄▄ ▄
Diacritics and non-Latin extensions	Ł, ł Code shared with È	▄ ▄▄▄ ▄ ▄ ▄▄▄
Diacritics and non-Latin extensions	Ń, ń Code shared with Ñ	▄▄▄ ▄▄▄ ▄ ▄▄▄ ▄▄▄
Diacritics and non-Latin extensions	Ñ, ñ Code shared with Ń	▄▄▄ ▄▄▄ ▄ ▄▄▄ ▄▄▄
Diacritics and non-Latin extensions	Ó, ó Code shared with Ö, Ø, [ ! ]	▄▄▄ ▄▄▄ ▄▄▄ ▄
Diacritics and non-Latin extensions	Ö, ö Code shared with Ó, Ø, [ ! ]	▄▄▄ ▄▄▄ ▄▄▄ ▄
Diacritics and non-Latin extensions	Ø, ø Code shared with Ó, Ö, [ ! ]	▄▄▄ ▄▄▄ ▄▄▄ ▄
Diacritics and non-Latin extensions	Ś, ś	▄ ▄ ▄ ▄▄▄ ▄ ▄ ▄
Diacritics and non-Latin extensions	Ŝ, ŝ Prosign for verified	▄ ▄ ▄ ▄▄▄ ▄
Diacritics and non-Latin extensions	Š, š Code shared with CH, Ĥ	▄▄▄ ▄▄▄ ▄▄▄ ▄▄▄
Diacritics and non-Latin extensions	Þ, þ	▄ ▄▄▄ ▄▄▄ ▄ ▄
Diacritics and non-Latin extensions	Ü, ü Code shared with Ŭ	▄ ▄ ▄▄▄ ▄▄▄
Diacritics and non-Latin extensions	Ŭ, ŭ Code shared with Ü	▄ ▄ ▄▄▄ ▄▄▄
Diacritics and non-Latin extensions	Ź, ź	▄▄▄ ▄▄▄ ▄ ▄ ▄▄▄ ▄
Diacritics and non-Latin extensions	Ż, ż	▄▄▄ ▄▄▄ ▄ ▄ ▄▄▄

=== Cut numbers ===
Since the 1870s, most numbers have an unofficial short-form, given in the table below. They are only used when both the sender and the receiver understand that numbers, and not letters, are intended; for example, one often sees the most common R-S-T signal report rendered as 5 N N ^{[‡]} instead of 5 9 9.

Cut numbers are made by reducing multiple dahs in the standard Morse number codes to only one dah, but keeping all the dits as-is. This leaves the codes for 4 and 6 unchanged.

Cut (abbreviated) numbers
Intended digit	"Cut" number code	Same as code in Intl. Morse	Normal code (long form)
0	▄▄▄	T	▄▄▄ ▄▄▄ ▄▄▄ ▄▄▄ ▄▄▄
1	▄ ▄▄▄	A	▄ ▄▄▄ ▄▄▄ ▄▄▄ ▄▄▄
2	▄ ▄ ▄▄▄	U	▄ ▄ ▄▄▄ ▄▄▄ ▄▄▄
3	▄ ▄ ▄ ▄▄▄	V	▄ ▄ ▄ ▄▄▄ ▄▄▄
4	▄ ▄ ▄ ▄ ▄▄▄	4	▄ ▄ ▄ ▄ ▄▄▄
5	▄ or ▄ ▄ ▄ ▄ ▄ (Note: Some operators just send the standard code for 5, even when using other cut numbers, since five dits are still fairly short (shorter than 4 and 6; same duration as 3 and 7, and one might imagine a single dit possibly being misinterpreted as either a mistaken 1 or cut decimal point.))	e or 5	▄ ▄ ▄ ▄ ▄
6	▄▄▄ ▄ ▄ ▄ ▄	6	▄▄▄ ▄ ▄ ▄ ▄
7	▄▄▄ ▄ ▄ ▄	B	▄▄▄ ▄▄▄ ▄ ▄ ▄
8	▄▄▄ ▄ ▄	D	▄▄▄ ▄▄▄ ▄▄▄ ▄ ▄
9	▄▄▄ ▄	N	▄▄▄ ▄▄▄ ▄▄▄ ▄▄▄ ▄
.	▄▄▄ ▄ ▄▄▄	K	▄ ▄▄▄ ▄ ▄▄▄ ▄ ▄▄▄

=== Prosigns ===
Prosigns for Morse code are special (usually) unwritten procedural signals or symbols that are used to indicate changes in communications protocol status or white space text formatting actions. Almost all prosigns are also used to encode special characters, such as +, =, or ;; the receiving telegrapher must distinguish the character-meaning from the prosign-meaning by context.

=== Symbol representations ===
The symbols !, $, and & are not defined inside the official ITU-R International Morse Code Recommendation, but informal conventions for them exist. (The @ symbol was formally added in 2004. The % and ‰ symbols both have recommended multi-character encodings (see below).)

Exclamation mark
There is no standard representation for the exclamation mark !, although the K̅W̅ digraph ( ▄▄▄ ▄ ▄▄▄ ▄ ▄▄▄ ▄▄▄ ) was proposed in the 1980s by the Heathkit Company. While Morse code translation software prefers the Heathkit version, on-air use is not yet universal, as some amateur radio operators in North America and the Caribbean continue to use the older M̅N̅ digraph ( ▄▄▄ ▄▄▄ ▄▄▄ ▄ ) copied over from American Morse landline code. M̅N̅ or O̅E̅, ▄▄▄ ▄▄▄ ▄▄▄ ▄ , which some telegraphers unofficially use for an exclamation mark !, is shared with unofficial letters Ö, Ó, and Ø used in some non-Latin alphabets.
Currency symbols
The ITU has never formally codified any currency symbols into Morse code: The unambiguous ISO 4217 currency codes are preferred for transmission (e.g. CNY, EUR, GBP, JPY, KRW, USD, etc.). The dollar sign ($) was represented in the Phillips Code collection of abbreviations as two characters "SX". Eventually operators dropped the intervening space and merged the two letter code or abbreviation into the single unofficial punctuation encoding S̅X̅ ( ▄ ▄ ▄ ▄▄▄ ▄ ▄ ▄▄▄ ).
Ampersand ( & )
The suggested unofficial encoding of the ampersand & sign listed above, often shown as A̅S̅, is also the official Morse prosign for wait. In addition, the American Morse encoding for an ampersand ( ▄ ▄ ▄ ▄ ) was similar to ES ( ▄ ▄ ▄ ▄ ), adapted from the code for ampersand in Railroad Morse. Hams have nearly universally carried over this use as an abbreviation for "and" (e.g. WX HR COLD ES RAINY "the weather here is cold and rainy"). Since ES is well established and slightly quicker than A̅S̅, there is no motive for replacing it.
Keyboard "at" sign ( @ )
On 24 May 2004—the 160th anniversary of the first public Morse telegraph transmission—the Radiocommunication Bureau of the International Telecommunication Union (ITU-R) formally added the @ ("commercial at" or "commat") character to the official Morse character set, using the sequence denoted by the A̅C̅ digraph: ▄ ▄▄▄ ▄▄▄ ▄ ▄▄▄ ▄ .
This sequence was reported to have been chosen to represent "A[t] C[ommercial]", or a letter 'a' inside a swirl represented by a letter 'C'. The new character facilitates sending e‑mail addresses by Morse code, and is notable since it is the first official addition to the Morse set of characters since World War I.
Percent ( % ) and permille ( ‰ ) signs
Percent and permille signs should be encoded with zeroes separated by a slash, joined to the preceding number by a dash; so e.g. "4%" would be sent as "4-0/0", and "5‰" as "5-0/00", and "6.7%" as "6.7-0/0".
Underscore
The underscore code is unofficial. Typically, when a whole word is meant to be underlined, the word begins with an underscore mark, followed by a letter space and the first letter of the word, and ends with the last letter of the word, followed by a letter space and another underscore mark. For example, read _MORSE_ as "Morse". Telegraphers may improvise other forms of use as needed (for example, for an underscore character embedded in a computer software keyword).

=== Diacritics and non-Latin extensions ===
É é is the only accented character that is encoded in the ITU-R Morse code standard.

The typical tactic for creating Morse codes for other Latin characters with diacritics and non-Latin alphabetic scripts has been to begin by simply re-using the International Morse codes already used for letters whose sound matches the sound of the local alphabet. Gerke code (the predecessor to International Morse) was in official use in central Europe and included four characters not included in the International Morse standard: Ä, Ö, Ü, and CH. These four have served as a starting point for other languages that use an alphabetic script, but require codes for letters not accommodated by International Morse.

The usual method has been to first transliterate the sounds represented by the International code and the four unique Gerke codes into the local alphabet, hence Greek, Hebrew, Russian, and Ukrainian Morse codes. If more codes are needed, one can either invent a new code or convert an otherwise unused code from either code set to the non-Latin letter. For example:

- Spanish letter Ñ in Spanish Morse is ▄▄▄ ▄▄▄ ▄ ▄▄▄ ▄▄▄ ; it is a unique code specific to the Spanish language (although also used elsewhere for equivalent Ń), and is not used in either International Morse nor in Gerke Morse.
- For the Greek letter Ψ, Greek Morse code uses the International Morse code for Q, ▄▄▄ ▄▄▄ ▄ ▄▄▄ , which has no corresponding letter in modern Greek. Except for the code being otherwise unused, the choice is arbitrary: Ψ and Q have no historical, phonetic, or shape relationship.

For Russian and Bulgarian, Russian Morse code maps the Cyrillic characters to four-element codes. Many of those characters are encoded the same as their Latin alphabet look-alikes or sound-alikes (A, O, E, I, T, M, N, R, K, etc.). The Bulgarian alphabet contains 30 characters, which exactly matches the number of all possible permutations of 1, 2, 3, and 4 dits and dahs (Russian Ы is used as Bulgarian Ь, Russian Ь is used as Bulgarian Ъ). Russian requires two more codes, for the letters Э and Ъ which are each encoded with 5 elements.

Non-alphabetic scripts require more radical adaptation. Japanese Morse code (Wabun code) has a separate encoding for kana script; although many of the codes are used for International Morse, the sounds they represent are mostly unrelated. The Japanese / Wabun code includes special prosigns for switching back-and-forth from International Morse: ▄▄▄ ▄ ▄ ▄▄▄ ▄▄▄ ▄▄▄ signals a switch from International Morse to Wabun, and ▄ ▄ ▄ ▄▄▄ ▄ to return from Wabun to International Morse.

For Chinese, Chinese telegraph code is used to map Chinese characters to four-digit codes and send these digits out using standard Morse code. Korean Morse code uses the SKATS mapping, originally developed to allow Korean to be typed on western typewriters. SKATS maps hangul characters to arbitrary letters of the Latin script and has no relationship to pronunciation in Korean.

=== Unusual variants ===
During early World War I (1914–1916), Germany briefly experimented with 'dotty' and 'dashy' Morse, in essence adding a dot or a dash at the end of each Morse symbol. Each one was quickly broken by Allied SIGINT, and standard Morse was resumed by Spring 1916. Only a small percentage of Western Front (North Atlantic and Mediterranean Sea) traffic was in 'dotty' or 'dashy' Morse during the entire war. In popular culture, this is mostly remembered in the book The Codebreakers by David Kahn and in the national archives of the UK and Australia (whose SIGINT operators copied most of this Morse variant). Kahn's cited sources come from the popular press and wireless magazines of the time.

Other variations include forms of "fractional Morse" or "fractionated Morse", which recombine the characters of the Morse code–encoded message and then encrypt them using a cipher in order to disguise the text.

== See also ==
- ACP 131 – Defines Allied Military brevity codes
- The CW Operators' Club – International organization for radio hams
- Guglielmo Marconi – Italian radio-frequency engineer and inventor (1874–1937)
- High-speed telegraphy – Type of radiosport
- Hog-Morse – Garbled telegraph message from a novice operator
- Instructograph – Morse code study aid
- Keyer – Electronic signalling device
- Morse code abbreviations – Abbreviations commonly used in Morse code
- Morse code mnemonics – Systems to remember Morse characters
- NATO phonetic alphabet – Spoken alphabet for radio communication
- QRP operation – Low-power amateur radio
- Radio code – Conventions used in wireless telegraphy
- Tap code – Encoding for text messages
- Telegraph key – Electrical switch used to transmit text messages in Morse code
- Wabun code – Japanese telegraphic code
- Wireless telegraphy – Method of communication by radio waves
