= Morse code for non-Latin alphabets =

This is a summary of the use of Morse code to represent alphabets other than Latin.

== Greek ==
The Greek Morse code alphabet is similar to that for the Latin alphabet, in most cases using either the Latin letter that looks most like the Greek capital letter, or that sounds like it. Example: A (alpha) in Greek has the same Morse code as Latin A, having the same glyph and sound. B (beta) in Greek has the same code as Latin B, even though it sounds like English V. The Greek Morse code alphabet uses one extra letter for Greek letter Χ (chi) and no longer uses the codes for Latin letters "J", "U" and "V".

Greek	Code	ITU	Greek	Code	ITU	Greek	Code	ITU
Α	▄ ▄▄▄	A	Ι	▄ ▄	I	Ρ	▄ ▄▄▄ ▄	R
Β	▄▄▄ ▄ ▄ ▄	B	Κ	▄▄▄ ▄ ▄▄▄	K	Σ	▄ ▄ ▄	S
Γ	▄▄▄ ▄▄▄ ▄	G	Λ	▄ ▄▄▄ ▄ ▄	L	Τ	▄▄▄	T
Δ	▄▄▄ ▄ ▄	D	Μ	▄▄▄ ▄▄▄	M	Υ	▄▄▄ ▄ ▄▄▄ ▄▄▄	Y
Ε	▄	E	Ν	▄▄▄ ▄	N	Φ	▄ ▄ ▄▄▄ ▄	F
Ζ	▄▄▄ ▄▄▄ ▄ ▄	Z	Ξ	▄▄▄ ▄ ▄ ▄▄▄	X	Χ	▄▄▄ ▄▄▄ ▄▄▄ ▄▄▄	
Η	▄ ▄ ▄ ▄	H	Ο	▄▄▄ ▄▄▄ ▄▄▄	O	Ψ	▄▄▄ ▄▄▄ ▄ ▄▄▄	Q
Θ	▄▄▄ ▄ ▄▄▄ ▄	C	Π	▄ ▄▄▄ ▄▄▄ ▄	P	Ω	▄ ▄▄▄ ▄▄▄	W
Diphthongs (obsolete)
HY	▄ ▄ ▄ ▄▄▄	V	YI	▄ ▄▄▄ ▄▄▄ ▄▄▄	J	OY	▄ ▄ ▄▄▄	U
OI	▄▄▄ ▄▄▄ ▄▄▄ ▄ ▄	8	EI	▄ ▄ ▄	S	AI	▄ ▄▄▄ ▄ ▄▄▄	
AY	▄ ▄ ▄▄▄ ▄▄▄		EY	▄▄▄ ▄▄▄ ▄▄▄ ▄				

The tonos is not transmitted in Morse code; the receiver can simply infer which vowels require one. The Greek diphthongs presented in the bottom three rows of the table are specified in old Greek Morse-code tables but they are never used in actual communication, the two vowels being sent separately.

== Cyrillic ==
Cyrillic letters are represented using the representation of similar-sounding Latin letters (e.g. Л ⇒ L). Cyrillic letters with no such Latin correspondence are assigned to Latin letters with no Cyrillic correspondence (e.g. Щ⇒Q). The same correspondence was later used to create Russian national character sets KOI-7 and KOI-8.

Cyrillic	Code	ITU	Cyrillic	Code	ITU	Cyrillic	Code	ITU	Cyrillic	Code	ITU
А	▄ ▄▄▄	A	И (Ukr. І)	▄ ▄	I	Р	▄ ▄▄▄ ▄	R	Ш	▄▄▄ ▄▄▄ ▄▄▄ ▄▄▄	
Б	▄▄▄ ▄ ▄ ▄	B	Й	▄ ▄▄▄ ▄▄▄ ▄▄▄	J	С	▄ ▄ ▄	S	Щ	▄▄▄ ▄▄▄ ▄ ▄▄▄	Q
В	▄ ▄▄▄ ▄▄▄	W	К	▄▄▄ ▄ ▄▄▄	K	Т	▄▄▄	T	Ь (Bul. Ъ)	▄▄▄ ▄ ▄ ▄▄▄	X
Г	▄▄▄ ▄▄▄ ▄	G	Л	▄ ▄▄▄ ▄ ▄	L	У	▄ ▄ ▄▄▄	U	Ы (Bul. Ь)	▄▄▄ ▄ ▄▄▄ ▄▄▄	Y
Д	▄▄▄ ▄ ▄	D	М	▄▄▄ ▄▄▄	M	Ф	▄ ▄ ▄▄▄ ▄	F	Э (Ukr. Є)	▄ ▄ ▄▄▄ ▄ ▄	É
Е	▄	E	Н	▄▄▄ ▄	N	Х	▄ ▄ ▄ ▄	H	Ю	▄ ▄ ▄▄▄ ▄▄▄	
Ж	▄ ▄ ▄ ▄▄▄	V	О	▄▄▄ ▄▄▄ ▄▄▄	O	Ц	▄▄▄ ▄ ▄▄▄ ▄	C	Я	▄ ▄▄▄ ▄ ▄▄▄	
З	▄▄▄ ▄▄▄ ▄ ▄	Z	П	▄ ▄▄▄ ▄▄▄ ▄	P	Ч	▄▄▄ ▄▄▄ ▄▄▄ ▄		Ї	▄ ▄▄▄ ▄▄▄ ▄▄▄ ▄	

The order and encoding shown uses the Russian national standard. The Bulgarian standard is the same except for the two letters (Ь, Ъ) given in parentheses: The Bulgarian language does not use Ы, while Ъ is frequent, but missing in Russian standard Morse.

The letter Ё (Yo) does not have an international Morse phonetic equivalent, with international Е used instead. Ukrainian Morse uses Є instead of Э, І instead of И, but also has И encoded as Ы, and has additional Ї (Yi).

== Hebrew ==
Hebrew letters are mostly represented using the Morse representation of a similar-sounding Latin letter (e.g. "Bet" ב≡B); however the representation for several letters are from a Latin letter with a similar shape (e.g. "Tet" ט ≡U, while "Tav" ת≡T). Though Hebrew Morse code is transcribed from right to left, the table below is transcribed from left to right as per the Latin letters in the table.

Letter	Code	ITU	Letter	Code	ITU
א	▄ ▄▄▄	A	ל	▄ ▄▄▄ ▄ ▄	L
ב	▄▄▄ ▄ ▄ ▄	B	מ	▄▄▄ ▄▄▄	M
ג	▄▄▄ ▄▄▄ ▄	G	נ	▄▄▄ ▄	N
ד	▄▄▄ ▄ ▄	D	ס	▄▄▄ ▄ ▄▄▄ ▄	C
ה	▄▄▄ ▄▄▄ ▄▄▄	O	ע	▄ ▄▄▄ ▄▄▄ ▄▄▄	J
ו	▄	E	פ	▄ ▄▄▄ ▄▄▄ ▄	P
ז	▄▄▄ ▄▄▄ ▄ ▄	Z	צ	▄ ▄▄▄ ▄▄▄	W
ח	▄ ▄ ▄ ▄	H	ק	▄▄▄ ▄▄▄ ▄ ▄▄▄	Q
ט	▄ ▄ ▄▄▄	U	ר	▄ ▄▄▄ ▄	R
י	▄ ▄	I	ש	▄ ▄ ▄	S
כ	▄▄▄ ▄ ▄▄▄	K	ת	▄▄▄	T

== Arabic ==
Letter	Code	ITU	Letter	Code	ITU	Letter	Code	ITU	Letter	Code	ITU
ا	▄ ▄▄▄	A	ذ	▄▄▄ ▄▄▄ ▄ ▄	Z	ط	▄ ▄ ▄▄▄	U	ل	▄ ▄▄▄ ▄ ▄	L
ب	▄▄▄ ▄ ▄ ▄	B	ر	▄ ▄▄▄ ▄	R	ظ	▄▄▄ ▄ ▄▄▄ ▄▄▄	Y	م	▄▄▄ ▄▄▄	M
ت	▄▄▄	T	ز	▄▄▄ ▄▄▄ ▄▄▄ ▄		ع	▄ ▄▄▄ ▄ ▄▄▄		ن	▄▄▄ ▄	N
ث	▄▄▄ ▄ ▄▄▄ ▄	C	س	▄ ▄ ▄	S	غ	▄▄▄ ▄▄▄ ▄	G	ه	▄ ▄ ▄▄▄ ▄ ▄	É
ج	▄ ▄▄▄ ▄▄▄ ▄▄▄	J	ش	▄▄▄ ▄▄▄ ▄▄▄ ▄▄▄		ف	▄ ▄ ▄▄▄ ▄	F	و	▄ ▄▄▄ ▄▄▄	W
ح	▄ ▄ ▄ ▄	H	ص	▄▄▄ ▄ ▄ ▄▄▄	X	ق	▄▄▄ ▄▄▄ ▄ ▄▄▄	Q	ي	▄ ▄	I
خ	▄▄▄ ▄▄▄ ▄▄▄	O	ض	▄ ▄ ▄ ▄▄▄	V	ك	▄▄▄ ▄ ▄▄▄	K	ﺀ	▄	E
د	▄▄▄ ▄ ▄	D									

== Kurdish ==
Letter	Code	ITU	Letter	Code	ITU	Letter	Code	ITU	Letter	Code	ITU	Letter	Code	ITU
ا	▄ ▄▄▄	A	گ	▄▄▄ ▄▄▄ ▄	G	ڵ	▄ ▄▄▄ ▄ ▄ ▄▄▄		ڕ	▄▄▄ ▄▄▄ ▄▄▄ ▄ ▄▄▄		و	▄ ▄▄▄ ▄▄▄	W
ب	▄▄▄ ▄ ▄ ▄	B	ھ	▄ ▄ ▄ ▄	H	م	▄▄▄ ▄▄▄	M	س	▄ ▄ ▄	S	خ	▄▄▄ ▄ ▄ ▄▄▄	X
ج	▄▄▄ ▄ ▄▄▄ ▄	C	ح	▄▄▄ ▄ ▄▄▄ ▄▄▄ ▄▄▄		ن	▄▄▄ ▄	N	ش	▄ ▄ ▄ ▄▄▄ ▄		غ	▄ ▄▄▄ ▄ ▄▄▄ ▄▄▄	
چ	▄▄▄ ▄ ▄▄▄ ▄ ▄		-	▄ ▄	I	نٚ	▄▄▄ ▄▄▄ ▄ ▄▄▄ ▄▄▄		ت	▄▄▄	T	ی	▄▄▄ ▄ ▄▄▄ ▄▄▄	Y
ڎ	▄ ▄ ▄▄▄ ▄▄▄ ▄		ی	▄ ▄▄▄ ▄▄▄ ▄▄▄ ▄		ۆ	▄▄▄ ▄▄▄ ▄▄▄	O	و	▄ ▄ ▄▄▄	U	ز	▄▄▄ ▄▄▄ ▄ ▄	Z
ە	▄	E	ژ	▄ ▄▄▄ ▄▄▄ ▄▄▄	J	پ	▄ ▄▄▄ ▄▄▄ ▄	P	وو	▄▄▄ ▄ ▄ ▄▄▄ ▄▄▄		ع	▄ ▄ ▄▄▄ ▄ ▄▄▄	
ێ	▄ ▄ ▄▄▄ ▄ ▄		ک	▄▄▄ ▄ ▄▄▄	K	ق	▄▄▄ ▄▄▄ ▄ ▄▄▄	Q	ۊ	▄ ▄ ▄▄▄ ▄▄▄		د	▄▄▄ ▄ ▄	D
ف	▄ ▄ ▄▄▄ ▄	F	ل	▄ ▄▄▄ ▄ ▄	L	ر	▄ ▄▄▄ ▄	R	ڤ	▄ ▄ ▄ ▄▄▄	V			

See kürtçe sözlük [Kurdish dictionary].

== Persian ==
Letter	Code	ITU	Letter	Code	ITU	Letter	Code	ITU	Letter	Code	ITU
ا	▄ ▄▄▄	A	خ	▄▄▄ ▄ ▄ ▄▄▄	X	ص	▄ ▄▄▄ ▄ ▄▄▄		ک	▄▄▄ ▄ ▄▄▄	K
ب	▄▄▄ ▄ ▄ ▄	B	د	▄▄▄ ▄ ▄	D	ض	▄ ▄ ▄▄▄ ▄ ▄	É	گ	▄▄▄ ▄▄▄ ▄ ▄▄▄	Q
پ	▄ ▄▄▄ ▄▄▄ ▄	P	ذ	▄ ▄ ▄ ▄▄▄	V	ط	▄ ▄ ▄▄▄	U	ل	▄ ▄▄▄ ▄ ▄	L
ت	▄▄▄	T	ر	▄ ▄▄▄ ▄	R	ظ	▄▄▄ ▄ ▄▄▄ ▄▄▄	Y	م	▄▄▄ ▄▄▄	M
ث	▄▄▄ ▄ ▄▄▄ ▄	C	ز	▄▄▄ ▄▄▄ ▄ ▄	Z	ع	▄▄▄ ▄▄▄ ▄▄▄	O	ن	▄▄▄ ▄	N
ج	▄ ▄▄▄ ▄▄▄ ▄▄▄	J	ژ	▄▄▄ ▄▄▄ ▄	G	غ	▄ ▄ ▄▄▄ ▄▄▄		و	▄ ▄▄▄ ▄▄▄	W
چ	▄▄▄ ▄▄▄ ▄▄▄ ▄		س	▄ ▄ ▄	S	ف	▄ ▄ ▄▄▄ ▄	F	ه	▄	E
ح	▄ ▄ ▄ ▄	H	ش	▄▄▄ ▄▄▄ ▄▄▄ ▄▄▄		ق	▄ ▄ ▄ ▄▄▄ ▄▄▄ ▄▄▄		ی	▄ ▄	I

See also fa:کد مورس

== Devanagari ==
Devanagari is a left-to-right abugida (alphasyllabary) widely used in the Indian subcontinent. The following telegraph code table is adapted from one given by Ashok Kelkar, where the Latin letters are encoded as per the International Morse code standard. Some variations on this code exist, and there have been some attempts to introduce other telegraph codes either to improve efficiency or to apply to more Indian languages. Proposals for a telegraph code suitable for multiple Indian languages have been made as early as 1948, shortly after independence.

Devanagari	Latin Morse	Devanagari	Latin Morse	Devanagari	Latin Morse	Devanagari	Latin Morse
ा	A	अ	TA	ः	EA	आ	IA
ि	D	इ	TD	ी	ED	ई	ID
ु	U	उ	TU	ू	EU	ऊ	IU
े	F	ए	TF	े	EF	ऐ	IF
ो	O	ओ	TO	ो	EO	औ	IO
क	K	क्	TK	ख	EK	ख्	IK
ग	G	ग्	TG	घ	EG	घ्	IG
च	C	च्	TC	छ	EC	छ्	IC
ज	J	ज्	TJ	झ	EJ	झ्	IJ
ट	Ä	ट्	TÄ	ठ	EÄ	ठ्	IÄ
ड	Ü	ड्	TÜ	ढ	EÜ	ढ्	IÜ
त	W	त्	TW	थ	EW	थ्	IW
द	Z	द्	TZ	ध	EZ	ध्	IZ
न	N	न्	TN	ं	EN	ँ	IN
प	P	प्	TP	फ	EP	फ्	IP
ब	B	ब्	TB	भ	EB	भ्	IB
म	M	म्	TM	ण	EM	ण्	IM
य	Y	य्	TY	ळ	EY	ळ्	IY
र	R	र्	TR		ER	क्र	IR
ल	L	ल्	TL	ञ	EL	ञ्	IL
व	V	व्	TV	ङ	EV	ङ्	IV
स	S	स्	TS	श	ES	श्	IS
ह	H	ह्	TH	ष	EH	ष्	IH
ृ	Ö	़	TÖ	ॆ	EÖ		IÖ
क्ष	Q	क्ष्	TQ	त्र	EQ	त्र्	IQ
ज्ञ	X	ज्ञ्	TX	श्र	EX	श्र्	IX
में	MM	है	TMM	मैं	EMM	हूँ	IMM

== Chinese ==
See Chinese telegraph code.

== Korean ==
A morse code specification for the Korean alphabet Hangul was published for the first time in 1888 in the text Chŏnbo changjŏng (전보장정; 電報章程) by Kim Hagu. Kim had a talent for languages from his time living abroad and was an advocate for Korea's modernization. In fall of 1884, he suggested to the Korean King Gojong (r. 1864–1907) that Korea develop a telegraph network. Gojong approved of this and sent Kim to Japan to prepare for this. While in Japan, Kim developed Hangul Morse code. The protocol was eventually published in 1888, and has been largely used in the same form ever since. The only exceptions are the eventual additions of codes for the letters ㅔ and ㅐ, which were absent in the original.

Hangul morse code
Letter	Code	ITU	Letter	Code	ITU
ㄱ	▄ ▄▄▄ ▄ ▄	L	ㅏ	▄	E
ㄴ	▄ ▄ ▄▄▄ ▄	F	ㅑ	▄ ▄	I
ㄷ	▄▄▄ ▄ ▄ ▄	B	ㅓ	▄▄▄	T
ㄹ	▄ ▄ ▄ ▄▄▄	V	ㅕ	▄ ▄ ▄	S
ㅁ	▄▄▄ ▄▄▄	M	ㅗ	▄ ▄▄▄	A
ㅂ	▄ ▄▄▄ ▄▄▄	W	ㅛ	▄▄▄ ▄	N
ㅅ	▄▄▄ ▄▄▄ ▄	G	ㅜ	▄ ▄ ▄ ▄	H
ㅇ	▄▄▄ ▄ ▄▄▄	K	ㅠ	▄ ▄▄▄ ▄	R
ㅈ	▄ ▄▄▄ ▄▄▄ ▄	P	ㅡ	▄▄▄ ▄ ▄	D
ㅊ	▄▄▄ ▄ ▄▄▄ ▄	C	ㅣ	▄ ▄ ▄▄▄	U
ㅋ	▄▄▄ ▄ ▄ ▄▄▄	X	ㅐ	▄▄▄ ▄▄▄ ▄ ▄▄▄	Q
ㅌ	▄▄▄ ▄▄▄ ▄ ▄	Z	ㅔ	▄▄▄ ▄ ▄▄▄ ▄▄▄	Y
ㅍ	▄▄▄ ▄▄▄ ▄▄▄	O			
ㅎ	▄ ▄▄▄ ▄▄▄ ▄▄▄	J			

== Japanese ==
Kana	Code	ITU	Kana	Code	ITU	Kana	Code	ITU	Kana	Code	ITU	Kana	Code	ITU
あ	▄▄▄ ▄▄▄ ▄ ▄▄▄ ▄▄▄		い	▄ ▄▄▄	A	う	▄ ▄ ▄▄▄	U	え	▄▄▄ ▄ ▄▄▄ ▄▄▄ ▄▄▄		お	▄ ▄▄▄ ▄ ▄ ▄	&
か	▄ ▄▄▄ ▄ ▄	L	き	▄▄▄ ▄ ▄▄▄ ▄ ▄		く	▄ ▄ ▄ ▄▄▄	V	け	▄▄▄ ▄ ▄▄▄ ▄▄▄	Y	こ	▄▄▄ ▄▄▄ ▄▄▄ ▄▄▄	
さ	▄▄▄ ▄ ▄▄▄ ▄ ▄▄▄		し	▄▄▄ ▄▄▄ ▄ ▄▄▄ ▄		す	▄▄▄ ▄▄▄ ▄▄▄ ▄ ▄▄▄		せ	▄ ▄▄▄ ▄▄▄ ▄▄▄ ▄		そ	▄▄▄ ▄▄▄ ▄▄▄ ▄	
た	▄▄▄ ▄	N	ち	▄ ▄ ▄▄▄ ▄	F	つ	▄ ▄▄▄ ▄▄▄ ▄	P	て	▄ ▄▄▄ ▄ ▄▄▄ ▄▄▄		と	▄ ▄ ▄▄▄ ▄ ▄	É
な	▄ ▄▄▄ ▄	R	に	▄▄▄ ▄ ▄▄▄ ▄	C	ぬ	▄ ▄ ▄ ▄	H	ね	▄▄▄ ▄▄▄ ▄ ▄▄▄	Q	の	▄ ▄ ▄▄▄ ▄▄▄	
は	▄▄▄ ▄ ▄ ▄	B	ひ	▄▄▄ ▄▄▄ ▄ ▄ ▄▄▄		ふ	▄▄▄ ▄▄▄ ▄ ▄	Z	へ	▄	E	ほ	▄▄▄ ▄ ▄	D
ま	▄▄▄ ▄ ▄ ▄▄▄	X	み	▄ ▄ ▄▄▄ ▄ ▄▄▄		む	▄▄▄	T	め	▄▄▄ ▄ ▄ ▄ ▄▄▄	=	も	▄▄▄ ▄ ▄ ▄▄▄ ▄	/
や	▄ ▄▄▄ ▄▄▄	W				ゆ	▄▄▄ ▄ ▄ ▄▄▄ ▄▄▄					よ	▄▄▄ ▄▄▄	M
ら	▄ ▄ ▄	S	り	▄▄▄ ▄▄▄ ▄	G	る	▄▄▄ ▄ ▄▄▄ ▄▄▄ ▄	(	れ	▄▄▄ ▄▄▄ ▄▄▄	O	ろ	▄ ▄▄▄ ▄ ▄▄▄	
わ	▄▄▄ ▄ ▄▄▄	K	ゐ	▄ ▄▄▄ ▄ ▄ ▄▄▄					ゑ	▄ ▄▄▄ ▄▄▄ ▄ ▄		を	▄ ▄▄▄ ▄▄▄ ▄▄▄	J
						ん	▄ ▄▄▄ ▄ ▄▄▄ ▄	+						

Punctuation		Code	ITU
◌゛	Dakuten	▄ ▄	I
◌゜	Handakuten	▄ ▄ ▄▄▄ ▄▄▄ ▄	
ー	Chōonpu	▄ ▄▄▄ ▄▄▄ ▄ ▄▄▄	
、	Comma	▄ ▄▄▄ ▄ ▄▄▄ ▄ ▄▄▄	.
。	Full stop	▄ ▄▄▄ ▄ ▄▄▄ ▄ ▄	
(	Left parenthesis	▄▄▄ ▄ ▄▄▄ ▄▄▄ ▄ ▄▄▄	)
)	Right parenthesis	▄ ▄▄▄ ▄ ▄ ▄▄▄ ▄	"

== Thai ==
See รหัสมอร์ส on the Thai Wikipedia
