= Glossary of amateur radio =

Definitions of terms used in amateur radio

This is glossary contains general definitions of typical amateur radio terms.

== A ==
AC
Alternating Current
ADC
Analogue to Digital Converter. Also known as A/D and A-to-D. A device that samples an analogue wave and converts it into a digital signal.
AF
Audio Frequency
AFC (Automatic Frequency Control)
Automatically compensate frequency drift.
AGC
Automatic gain control for controlling gain on the receiver to the output level.
AM
Amplitude Modulation
Amateur Radio (Ham Radio)
the use of the radio spectrum for non-commercial communication, technical experimentation, self-training, recreation, radiosport, contesting, and emergency communications.
Amplifier
A device used to increase the power of a signal.
AMSAT
AMateur SATellite
Antenna
A device that radiates radio waves for transmitting or receiving radio signals.
APRS (Automatic Packet Reporting System)
Digital communication system utilized by amateur radio operators to exchange messages and track locations utilizing GPS.
ATT (ATTenuator)
A device used to reduce the power of a signal without appreciably distorting its waveform.

== B ==
Band
A specific range of frequencies in the radio spectrum.
Baud
The rate at which data is transmitted measured in bits per second
BCB
Abbreviation for the AM "broadcast band" running from 540 to 1700 kHz
Beacon
A transmitter that sends out a signal for use in direction finding or for the benefit of other hams.
Beam Antenna
An antenna that concentrates signals in a particular direction.
BPSK
Binary Phase Shift Keying
Break-In
A method of operation where transmission and reception alternate without the need to manually switch between the two.
Brick
Is a small, portable, and solid-state ham radio amplifier

== C ==
Call Sign
A unique designation for a transmitter station.
Carrier Wave
A simple, unmodulated radio wave that can be modulated to carry information.
CTCSS
Continuous Tone-Coded Squelch System – a sub-audible tone that is frequently used on repeaters. The signal “opens” the repeater for use.
Current
Electric current. Flow of electricity through a conductor, usually associated with electron movement. Current is actually the transfer of charge between atoms.
CW (Morse code)
A communications mode transmitted by on/off keying of a radio-frequency signal. Another name for international Morse code.

== D ==
D region
The lowest region of the ionosphere. The D region contributes very little to radio wave propagation.
DAC
Also known as D/A and D-to-A. Digital to Analogue converter. A device that converts digital signals into analogue signals.
dB
Decibel – the ratio of two power measurements.
dBd
dB relative to a dipole.
Data communications
Transfer of data between two or more locations.
dBd
Unit of RF power as compared to a dipole antenna.
dBi
Unit of RF power as compared to an isotropic antenna.

== E ==
Earth Station
A station located either on Earth’s surface or within Earth’s atmosphere intended for communication with one or more space stations, or with one or more stations of the same kind by means of one or more reflecting satellites or other objects in space.
Echolink
A computer-based Amateur Radio system distributed free of charge that allows radio amateurs to communicate with other amateur radio operators using Voice over IP (VoIP) technology on the Internet for at least part of the path between them.
EME (Earth-Moon-Earth)
Also known as moon bounce, is a radio communications technique that relies on the propagation of radio waves from an Earth-based transmitter directed via reflection from the surface of the Moon back to an Earth-based receiver.
ERP (Effective Radiated Power)
The amount of power that a half-wave dipole antenna would need to radiate to match the signal strength observed from the actual antenna in its strongest direction.
ETSI (European Telecommunications Standards Institute)
An independent, non-profit, standardization organization in the telecommunications industry in Europe, headquartered in Sophia-Antipolis, France.

== F ==
Fade
A decrease in the intensity of a signal.
FCC (Federal Communications Commission)
The government body responsible for regulating radio and other forms of communication in the United States.
Feedline
The wires or cables used to connect a radio transmitter or receiver to an antenna.
FM (Frequency Modulation)
A method of impressing data onto an alternating-current (AC) wave by varying the instantaneous frequency of the wave.
FOC (First Operator Certificate)
A certificate awarded to proficient Morse code operators.
Frequency
The number of times that a periodic function repeats the same sequence of values during a unit variation of the independent variable.
Full Duplex
A method of communication where transmission and reception occur simultaneously.

== G ==
Gain
The measure of amplification achieved by an antenna or amplifier.
Ground
A common return path for electric current, or a direct physical connection to the Earth.
Ground Plane
An antenna in which one quarter-wave element radiates and the other elements act as a ground plane.
Ground Wave
A radio wave travelling along the surface of the Earth.
Guard Band
A narrow frequency range that separates two bands, into which no signals should be transmitted.
Gain Antenna
An antenna with a focused pattern in a particular direction (or more directions).
Grid Square
A method of describing your location anywhere on the Earth’s surface. Refers to the Maidenhead Locator System.

== H ==
Ham
Informal name for an amateur radio operator.
Harmonic
An integer multiple of the fundamental frequency of a signal.
Half-wave dipole
A simple antenna used by radio amateurs. It consists of a length of wire or tubing, opened and fed at the center. The entire antenna is 1/2 wavelength long at the desired operating frequency.
High Pass Filter (HPF)
A filter that passes signals with a frequency higher than a certain cutoff frequency and attenuates signals with frequencies lower than the cutoff frequency.
HT (Handheld Transceiver)
Also known as a walkie-talkie, it’s a portable two-way radio transceiver.
Hz (Hertz)
The unit of frequency in the International System of Units (SI) that is equal to one cycle per second.

== I ==
IF (Intermediate Frequency)
A frequency to which a carrier frequency is shifted as an intermediate step in transmission or reception.
Impedance
The measure of the opposition that a circuit presents to a current when a voltage is applied. Its symbol is usually Z.
Inductor
A passive electronic component that stores energy in the form of a magnetic field.
Ionosphere
The layer of the Earth’s atmosphere that is ionized by solar and cosmic radiation. It lies 75-1000 km above the Earth and it is able to reflect radio waves.
Isotropic Antenna
A hypothetical antenna that radiates power uniformly in all directions.

== K ==
K
Prosign for “go ahead” or “over”.
Key
A device used to manually send Morse code. It is also called telegraph key, clacker, tapper or morse key
Keyer
An electronic device used for sending Morse code.
KN
Prosign for “go ahead only”, used to invite a specific station to transmit.
Kilohertz (kHz)
A unit of frequency equal to one thousand hertz.

== L ==
LF (Low Frequency)
30–300 kHz range signals.
Li-Ion (Lithium Ion)
Rechargeable battery which has better capacity than Ni-Cd, Ni-MH, etc., no memory effect after repeated non-full charge/discharge cycles.
Link
A radio connection between two points.
Logbook
A record of all contacts made with other stations.
Long Wire Antenna
An antenna that is a quarter wavelength or longer and is driven at one end and open at the other.
Loop Antenna
A type of antenna that consists of a loop of wire, usually one full wavelength long, typically used for listening and transmitting on the HF bands.

== M ==
MARS
Military Affiliate Radio Service
MF (Medium Frequency)
300–3000 kHz range signals.
Microwave
Radio waves with very short wavelengths, typically in the range of 1 millimeter to 100 millimeters.
Modulation
The process of varying one or more properties of a periodic waveform, called the carrier signal, with a separate signal that contains
information to be transmitted.
Morse Code
A method used in telecommunication to encode text characters as sequences of two different signal durations, called dots and dashes.

== N ==
NB
Noise Blanker
NF
Noise Figure
NiCd
Nickel-Cadmium, a type of rechargeable battery
NiMH
Nickel-Metal Hydride, a type of rechargeable battery
NTSC
National Television System Committee, the analog television system used in North America
NVIS
Near Vertical Incidence Skywave, a propagation mode which uses high-angle radiation to send signals almost straight up to be reflected back to Earth for local and regional communications

== O ==
OFDM
Orthogonal Frequency-Division Multiplexing, a method of encoding digital data on multiple carrier frequencies.
Ohm
The unit of electrical resistance in the International System of Units (SI).
OM
Old Man, a term of endearment often used when referring to other male amateur radio operators.
OP
Operator, the person operating the radio station.
OSCAR
Orbiting Satellite Carrying Amateur Radio, a series of amateur satellites.
OTA
On The Air, indicating that a station is broadcasting.
Output Frequency
The frequency a repeater transmits on.

== P ==
Packet
A digital mode where data is sent in bite-sized chunks at a time (packets).
Passband
The range of frequencies or wavelengths that can pass through a filter without being attenuated.
Peak Envelope Power (PEP)
The average power supplied to the antenna transmission line by a transmitter during one radio frequency cycle at the crest of the modulation envelope taken under normal operating conditions.
PL Tone
Private Line Tone (also known as CTCSS) is an analog squelch scheme used in commercial two-way radio.
PM
Phase Modulation, a form of modulation that represents information as variations in the instantaneous phase of a carrier wave.
Propagation
The behavior of radio waves as they travel, or are propagated, from one point to another, or into various parts of the atmosphere.
PTT
Push-To-Talk, a method of having conversations or talking on half-duplex communication lines, including two-way radio, using a momentary button to switch from voice reception mode to transmit mode.
Pulse Modulation
A modulation technique that involves altering the characteristics of a periodic wave to vary the pulse amplitude, duration, position, or the number of pulses.

== Q ==
Q Codes
Three-letter symbols beginning with Q. Used on CW to save time and to improve communication. Some examples are QRS (send slower), QTH (location), QSO (ham conversation) and QSL (acknowledgment of receipt).
QRA
My name is … / What is the name of your station?
QRB
The distance between our stations is … / How far are you from my station?
QRG
Your exact frequency in kilohertz is … / What is my exact frequency?
QRL
I’m busy, please do not interfere. / Are you busy?
QRM
You are being interfered with. / Is my transmission being interfered with?
QRN
You are being troubled by static or atmospheric noise. / Are you troubled by static or atmospheric noise?
QRO
I will increase power. / Shall I increase transmitter power?
QRP
Low power
QRT
I am going to stop sending. / Shall I stop sending?
QRU
I have nothing for you. / Have you anything for me?
QRV
I am ready to receive your message. / Are you ready?
QRW
I want to inform … that you are calling him on … kHz/MHz. / Shall I inform … that you are calling him on … kHz/MHz?
QRX
Please wait. / When will you call me again?
QRZ
Who is calling me? / You are being called by … on … kHz/MHz.
QSA
The strength of your signals is … (1-5). / What is the strength of my signals?
QSB
Your signals are fading. / Are my signals fading?
QSD
Your keying is defective. / Is my keying defective?
QSG
I will send … telegrams at a time. / How many telegrams have you to send?
QSK
I can hear you during my transmission. / Can you hear me during your transmission?
QSL
I am acknowledging receipt. / Can you acknowledge receipt?
QSL card
A postcard that serves as a confirmation of communication between two hams.
QSM
I will repeat the last telegram which I sent to you. / Will you repeat the last telegram which you sent to me?
QSN
I did hear … on … kHz/MHz. / Did you hear … on … kHz/MHz?
QSO
I can communicate with … direct (or via … relay station). / Can you communicate with … direct or by relay?
QSP
I will relay to … free of charge. / Will you relay to … free of charge?
QST
General call to all stations.
QSU
I will send on this frequency (or on … kHz/MHz). / Will you send on this frequency (or on … kHz/MHz)?
QSW
I will transmit on … kHz/MHz. / Will you transmit on … kHz/MHz?
QSX
I am listening on … kHz/MHz. / Will you listen on … kHz/MHz?
QSY
I will change to transmission on another frequency. / Will you change to transmission on another frequency?
QSZ
I will send each word or group twice. / Will you send each word or group twice?
QTA
I will cancel telegram number … . / Will you cancel telegram number … ?
QTB
I do not agree with your counting of words. / Do you agree with my counting of words?
QTC
I have … telegrams for you (or for …). / How many telegrams have you got?
QTH
My location is … . / What is your location?
QTR
The time is … . / What is the exact time?

== R ==
RAC
Radio Amateurs of Canada, the national amateur radio organization for Canada.
Radioteletype
A telecommunications system consisting originally of two or more electromechanical teleprinters in different locations, later superseded by digital computer versions.
Ragchew
An extended, informal conversation between amateur radio operators.
Repeater
A device that receives a signal on one frequency and retransmits it on another frequency, allowing signals to cover greater distances.
RF (Radio Frequency)
The oscillation rate of an alternating electromagnetic wave in the frequency range from around 20 kHz to around 300 GHz.
RTTY
See: Radioteletype.
RX
Receive or receiver.

== S ==
SDR
Software Defined Radio, a radio communication system where components that have been traditionally implemented in hardware are instead implemented by means of software on a personal computer or embedded system.
SIGNAVI
Sub-receiver that moves across bands whilst you are listening therefore reducing the time of the scan.
S-meter
A meter on a radio that tells you how strong the received signal is. Each S unit usually represents 3dB (formerly 6dB).
Squelch
A circuit function that acts to suppress the audio (or video) output of a receiver in the absence of a sufficiently strong desired input signal.
SSB
Single Sideband, a common mode of voice transmission on the HF bands in ham radio.
SWR
Standing Wave Ratio, a measure of impedance matching of loads to the characteristic impedance of a transmission line or waveguide.

== T ==
T/R
Transmit/Receive
TNC
Terminal Node Controller, a device used to communicate with packet radio networks.
Transceiver
A device that can both transmit and receive communications, in particular a combined radio transmitter and receiver.
Transponder
A device for receiving a radio signal and automatically transmitting a different signal.
Tropospheric Ducting
A type of radio propagation that tends to happen during periods of stable, anticyclonic weather. In this propagation method, when the signal encounters a rise in temperature in the atmosphere instead of the normal decrease (known as a temperature inversion), the higher refractive index of the atmosphere there will cause the signal to be bent and allows the radio wave to travel further than the normal line of sight distance.
Twisted Pair
A type of wiring in which two conductors of a single circuit are twisted together for the purposes of improving electromagnetic compatibility.

== U ==
UHF (Ultra High Frequency)
The band of frequencies between 300 MHz and 1300 MHz.

== V ==
VFO
Variable Frequency Oscillator, a type of oscillator that can be tuned to a variable frequency.
VHF (Very High Frequency)
The band of frequencies between 30 MHz and 300 MHz. This includes the popular amateur 6-meter (50 MHz) and 2-meter bands (144 MHz).
VOX
Voice Operated Transmit, a switch that starts the transmitter in response to audio, usually your voice.
VSWR (Voltage Standing Wave Ratio)
A measure of impedance matching of loads to the characteristic impedance of a transmission line or waveguide.

== W ==
W
Abbreviation for Watts, a unit of power.
Watt
A unit of power. In radio terms, it is a measure of the power level of a signal.
Waveform
The shape and form of a signal such as the wave from a transmitter. The waveform describes the change in voltage over time.
Wavelength
The distance between one peak or crest of a wave of light, heat, or other energy and the next corresponding peak or crest.
Whip Antenna
A type of antenna that consists of a straight, flexible rod or wire, sometimes wound over a core of insulating material.
White Noise
A random signal having equal intensity at different frequencies, giving it a constant power spectral density.
Wideband
A transmission medium or channel that has a wider bandwidth than one voice channel (or the equivalent).
Wire Antenna
A type of antenna using a wire element or elements to radiate the radio signals.
WAS (Worked All States)
An award given to amateur radio operators who have successfully made contact with other amateur radio operators in each of the 50 U.S. states.
WX
Abbreviation for Weather.

== X ==
XIT
Transmitter Incremental Tuning, a feature found on some transceivers allowing the operator to slightly shift the transmitting frequency.
XTAL
Short for crystal, which can be used to control the frequency of an oscillator.

== Y ==
Yagi
A directional antenna consisting of at least two parallel resonant elements. More correctly called a Yagi-Uda antenna, as it was developed jointly by Mr Yagi and Mr Uda.
YL
Young Lady, a term used to refer to female amateur radio operators.

== Z ==
Zener (Zener diode)
A type of diode used to regulate the operating voltage
Zulu
Refers to the UTC time zone. You may encounter times listed as 17:00z, which means 5pm UTC.
