= Bahamut (disambiguation) =

Bahamut is a giant fish from Arabian mythology.

Bahamut may also refer to:

- Bahamut (Dungeons & Dragons), a dragon deity in Dungeons & Dragons
- Bahamut (Final Fantasy), a character from the Final Fantasy video game series
- Bahamut (band), a heavy metal band from Detroit, Michigan
- Bahamut (album), an album by Hazmat Modine, or its title track
- Bahamut, an apocalyptic dragon entity from fantasy franchise Rage of Bahamut

== See also ==
- Bahmut, commune in Moldova
- Behemoth (disambiguation)
