= Jesse Schoberg =

American entrepreneur

- Born: United States
- Occupation: Entrepreneur
- Known for: Co-founder and CEO of DropInBlog
- Website: schoberg.net

Jesse Schoberg is an American entrepreneur best known as the co-founder and Chief Executive Officer (CEO) of DropInBlog, a SaaS platform for adding blogs to existing websites.

== Career ==
Schoberg is the co-founder and CEO of DropInBlog, a SaaS platform that enables blogging on existing websites. Under his leadership, the company achieved seven-figure annual revenue.

He was a featured speaker at MicroConf Europe 2025, a conference series for bootstrapped startups.

== Personal life ==
Schoberg has gained media attention for his adoption of a digital nomad lifestyle. In 2022, he was profiled by CNBC for relocating from the United States to Bangkok, Thailand, detailing his lifestyle and the financial aspects of living as an expatriate. He has shared insights on mastering the digital nomad life, emphasizing the importance of reliable internet, community and work-life balance. His story has been featured in international media, discussing the comparative quality of life and the logistics of running a remote business from abroad.
