= Behemoth (disambiguation) =

Behemoth is a creature from the Book of Job, a book from the Hebrew Bible.

Behemoth may also refer to:

== Books ==
- Behemoth (Hobbes book), also The Long Parliament, a 1682 book by Thomas Hobbes
- Behemoth (novel), a 2010 novel by Scott Westerfeld
- Behemoth, a 2004 omnibus volume of Stephen Baxter's The Mammoth Trilogy
- Behemoth, a 2022 novel by HP Newquist
- Behemoth: The Structure and Practice of National Socialism, a 1944 book by Franz Leopold Neumann
- Behemoth Comics, a comic book publisher distributed globally by Simon & Schuster

== Film and TV ==
- Behemoth, the Sea Monster, a 1958 science fiction film
- Behemoth (2011 film), a 2011 American horror film
- Behemoth (2015 film), a Chinese documentary film
- Behemoth!, a 2026 American drama film

== Fictional characters ==
- Behemoth (Air Gear), a fictional team in the manga/anime Air Gear
- Behemoth (Advanced Dungeons & Dragons), a monstrous relative of the hippopotamus appearing in the 1st edition of the Advanced Dungeons & Dragons role-playing game
- Behemoth (Dungeons & Dragons 3rd edition), an enormously large version of an animal appearing in the 3rd edition of Dungeons & Dragons
- Behemoth (Dungeons & Dragons 4th edition), the name for several varieties of dinosaur appearing the 4th edition of Dungeons & Dragons
- Behemoth (Master and Margarita), a talking cat in the novel The Master and Margarita by Mikhail Bulgakov
- Behemoth, an Endbringer in the web serial Worm
- Behemoth (DC Comics), a member of the Hybrid DC Comics supervillain group
- The Behemoth, a computer from the children's series Dark Season
- Behemoth, a gigantic mobile artillery walker in the game Command & Conquer 3: Kane's Wrath
- Behemoth, a monster in the Final Fantasy series
- Behemoth, an enemy airship in Jak and Daxter: The Lost Frontier
- Behemoth, the son of Bolivar, Donald Duck's pet St. Bernard
- Behemoth, a minor character from Once Upon a Time
- Behemoth, a character for the game Evolve
- Behemoth, a character from The Muppets
- Behemoth, the demon summoned by the village children in the film The Blood on Satan's Claw
- Behemoth, a Titan from the 2019 film Godzilla: King of the Monsters

== Music ==
- Behemoth (band), a Polish blackened death metal band
- "Behemoth", a song by Raven from their 1988 album Nothing Exceeds Like Excess
- "Behemoth" (Static-X song), a song by Static-X from their 2007 album Cannibal
- "Behemoth", a song by August Burns Red from the 2026 album Season of Surrender
- "Behemoth", a song by Electric Wizard from their 1995 eponymous album
- "Behemoth", a song by The Famine from the 2008 album The Raven and the Reaping
- "Behemoth", a song by Rob Sonic from the 2004 album Telicatessen
- "Behemoth", a song by Tad from the 1989 album God's Balls
- "The Behemoth", a song by The Acacia Strain from the 2008 album Continent
- "The Behemoth", a song by The Shadows of Knight from the 1966 album Back Door Men

== Other ==
- Behemoth (ammonite), an extinct cephalopod
- Behemoth (roller coaster), a steel roller coaster at Canada's Wonderland
- Operation Behemoth, a codename of a series of large-scale Soviet naval exercises in 1989 and 1991
- The Behemoth, a video game development company in San Diego, California
- Behemoth (game), a 2024 video game
- Behemoth, a GWR 3031 Class locomotive
- Big Electronic Human Energized Machine, Only Too Heavy (BEHEMOTH), an electric bicycle
- Behemoth (horse), an Australian racehorse
- Skydance's Behemoth, a 2024 video game developed by Skydance Interactive
