= Vibroplex =

US manufacturer of telegraph keys

- Industry: Telegraphy, amateur radio
- Founder: Horace G. Martin
- Headquarters: Knoxville, Tennessee, U.S.
- Products: Morse code keys
- Owner: Scott Robbins
- Website: Vibroplex Co., Inc.

Vibroplex is the brand of a side-to-side mechanical, semi-automatic Morse key first manufactured and sold in 1905 by the Vibroplex Company, following its invention and patent by Horace Greeley Martin of New York City in 1904. The original device became known as a "bug." The Vibroplex Company has been in continuous operation for 119 years, as of 2024. Amateur radio operator Scott E. Robbins, also known by the call sign W4PA, became the eighth owner of the Vibroplex Company on December 21, 2009. The company is located in Knoxville, Tennessee.

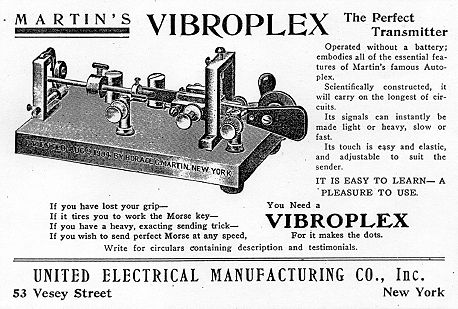
An advertisement from Martin's Vibroplex from "Telegraph Age", May 1906

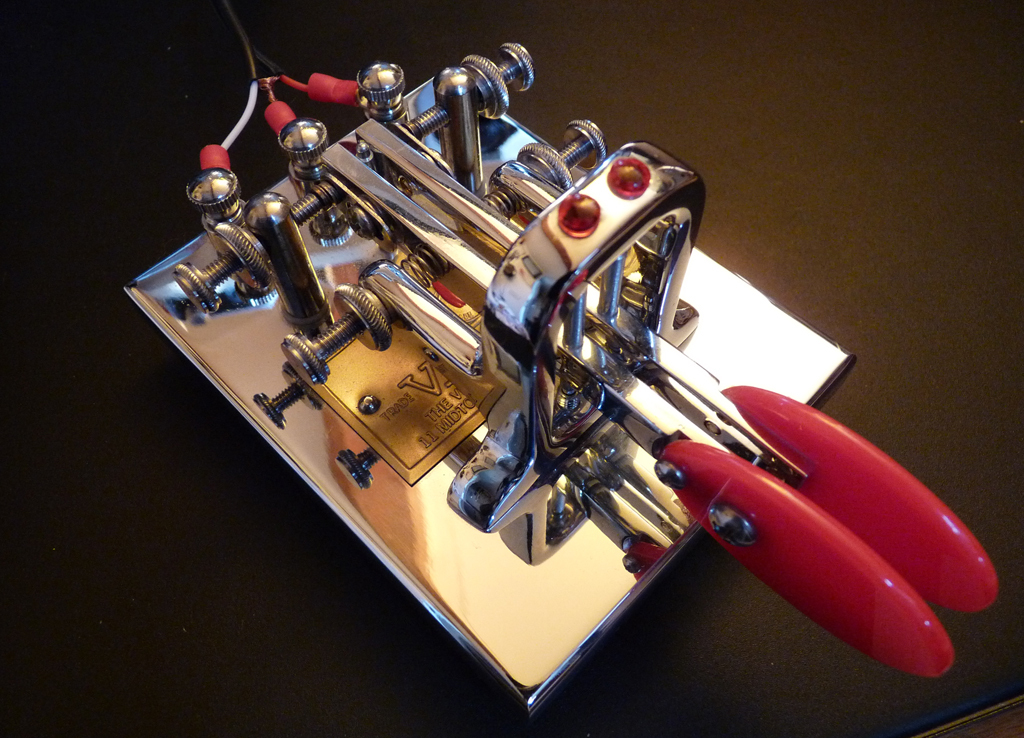
A Vibroplex "Iambic Deluxe" model

The most common Vibroplex models have a single lever with a flat thumbpiece, or paddle, on the left side and a fingerpiece, or knob, on the right side.

The advantage of the key over a standard telegraph key is that it automatically generates strings of one of the two pulses from which Morse code characters are composed, the shortest one, or "dot" (or dits), so that the operator's hand does not have to make the rapid movements necessary to generate multiple dots. When the knob is pressed from the right, it makes continuous contact suitable for sending "dashes" (or dahs). When the paddle is pressed from the left, a horizontal pendulum at the opposite end of the lever is set into motion, intermittently closing a set of contacts and sending a series of short pulses, "dots" at a speed controlled by the position of the pendulum weight. A skilled operator can achieve sending speeds of over 40 words per minute with a bug.

The Vibroplex Original Bug key has been in continuous production for over 100 years, with only minor cosmetic changes. Numerous Vibroplex keys are available to this day; the company presently markets and sells 27 variations of Morse code keys, including the Original Bug, iambic paddles, the Vibrokeyer (an electronic variant of the Original Bug), and traditional straight keys.

== See also ==
- High-speed telegraphy
- Morse code
- Prosigns for Morse code
- Telegrapher
- Telegraph key
