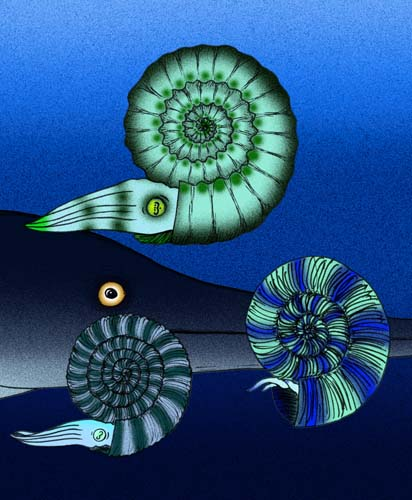
- Comparisons of B. lapideus, B. megasthene, Titanites, and Brachypterygius

Scientific classification
- Kingdom: Animalia
- Phylum: Mollusca
- Class: Cephalopoda
- Order: Ammonitida
- Superfamily: Perisphinctoidea
- Family: Dorsoplanitidae
- Genus: Behemoth S.S. Buckman, 1921

Type species
- Behemoth lapideus

Species
- B. lapideus Buckman, 1921; B. megasthene Buckman, 1921; B. groenlandicus Spath 1936

= Behemoth (ammonite) =

Behemoth Temporal range: Tithonian

Genus of Jurassic ammonite mollusc

Behemoth is an extinct ammonite cephalopod genus within the family Dorsoplanitidae, that lived during the upper Tithonian stage of Late Jurassic Europe and Greenland.

== Description ==
Behemoth ammonites grew fairly large, with a shell diameter over one meter in the type species, B. lapideus.
