= Digital nomad =

Wandering remote worker

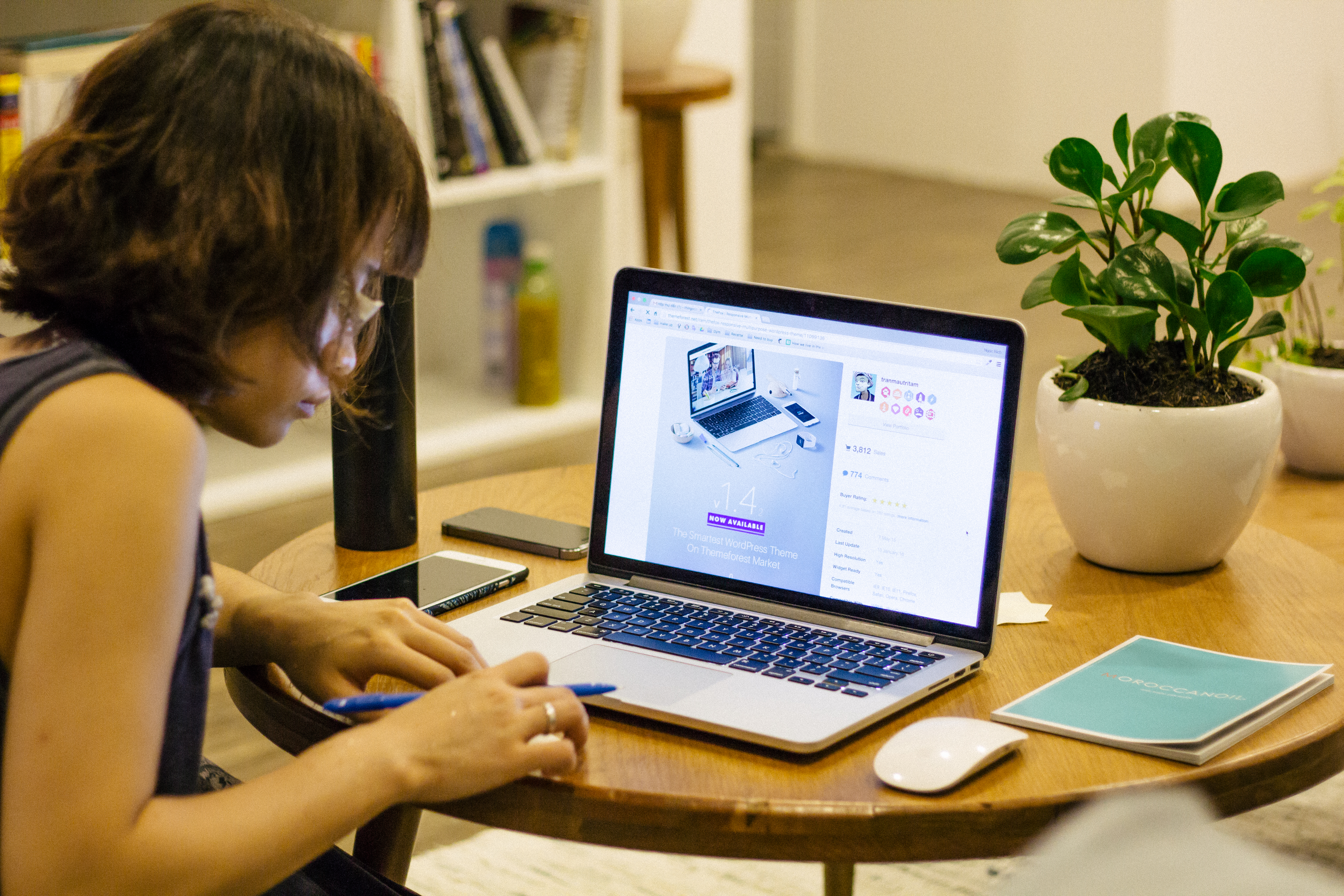
A person working from a cafe in Vietnam

A digital nomad is a person who travels freely while working remotely using information and communications technology such as the Internet. These location-independent professionals generally have minimal material possessions and work remotely in temporary housing (such as hotels), internet cafés, public libraries, co-working spaces, or recreational vehicles, using Wi-Fi or mobile hotspots to access the Internet.

The majority of digital nomads describe themselves as programmers, content creators, designers, or developers. Some digital nomads are perpetual travelers, while others only maintain the lifestyle for a short period of time. While some nomads travel through multiple countries, others remain in one area, and some may choose to travel while living in a vehicle, in a practice often known as van-dwelling.

In 2023, there were 17.3 million American digital nomads, which was a 131% increase since 2019, and the number increased to 18.1 million in 2024.

== Etymology ==
One of the first digital nomads was Steven K. Roberts, who from 1983 to 1991 rode more than 10,000 miles across the United States on a computerized recumbent bicycle equipped with amateur radio (callsign N4RVE) and other equipment (satellite email and paging system) that allowed him to talk, type and work on the move during the day before camping at night. Roberts was featured in Popular Computing magazine and the magazine referred to him as a "high-tech nomad".

The term "digital nomad" started to be used in the early 1990s to describe a new type of high-tech traveling lifestyle made possible by the growth of computer networking and the popularization of mobile devices such as laptops, tablets and PDAs. In his 1992 travelogue Exploring the Internet, Carl Malamud described a "digital nomad" who "travels the world with a laptop, setting up FidoNet nodes." In 1993, Random House published the Digital Nomad's Guide series of guidebooks by Mitch Ratcliffe and Andrew Gore. The guidebooks, PowerBook, AT&T EO Personal Communicator, and Newton's Law, used the term "digital nomad" to refer to the increased mobility and more powerful communication and productivity technologies that new mobile devices introduced.

Craig McCaw predicted in 1993 that the union of telecommunication and computing would create a new nomadic industry. By enabling people to conduct business from any location, wireless communication and digital assistants would facilitate a return to a nomadic lifestyle, with people moving as they wished and taking their environment and possessions with them.

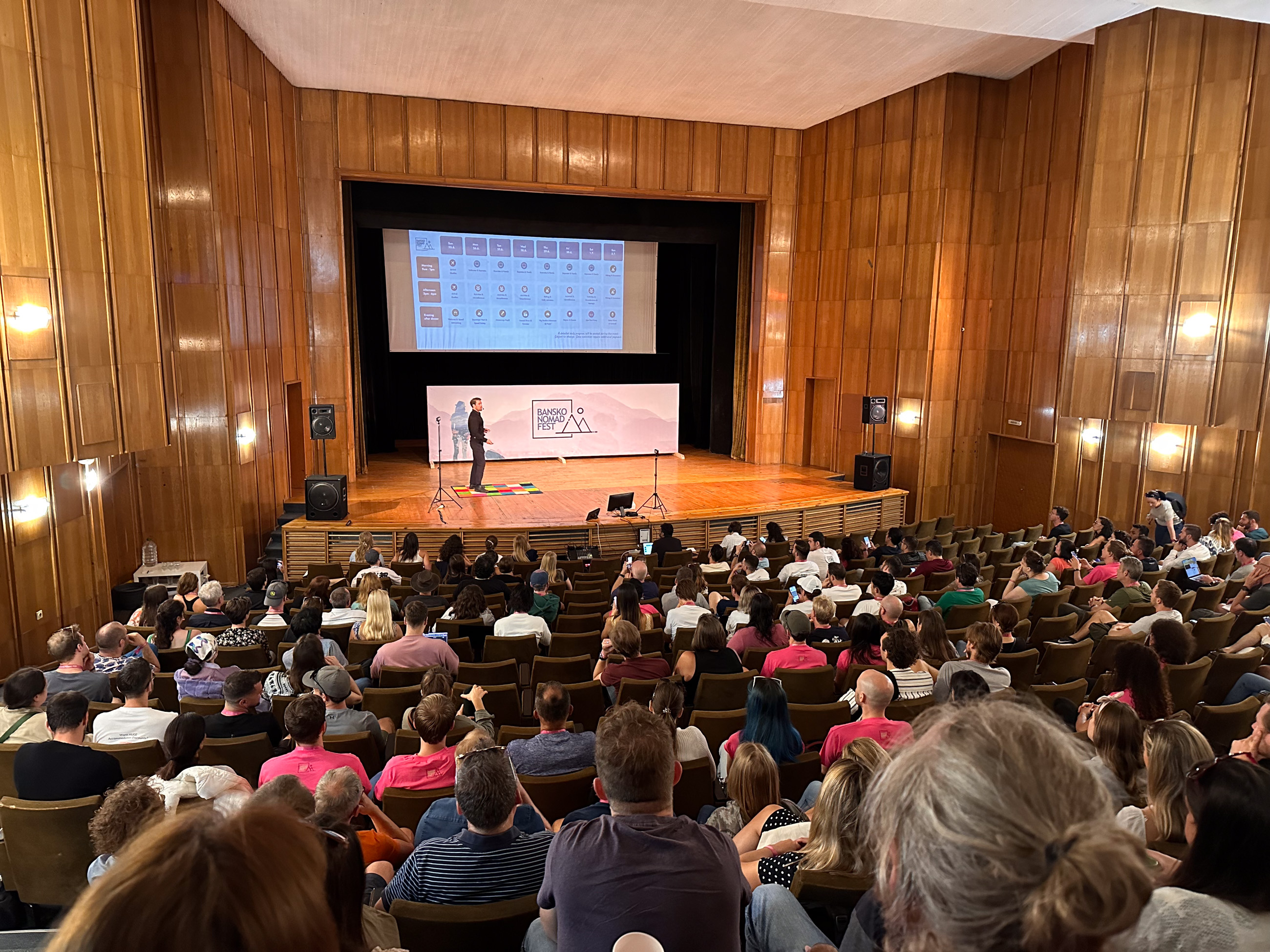
Bansko Nomad Fest, an annual conference in Bulgaria for digital nomads

The 1997 book Digital Nomad, by Tsugio Makimoto and David Manners, used the term to describe how technology allows for a return of societies to a nomadic lifestyle. Makimoto and Manners identified an emerging "digital nomad" lifestyle, freed by technology "from the constraints of geography and distance." One of the first uses of the term digital nomads in research was in 2006 in the paper "Towards the Epistemology of digital nomads" by Patokorpi.

In contemporary usage, the term broadly describes a category of highly mobile, location-independent professionals who are able to live and work remotely from anywhere in the world with internet access, due to the integration of mobile technology into everyday life and work settings.

== Benefits ==
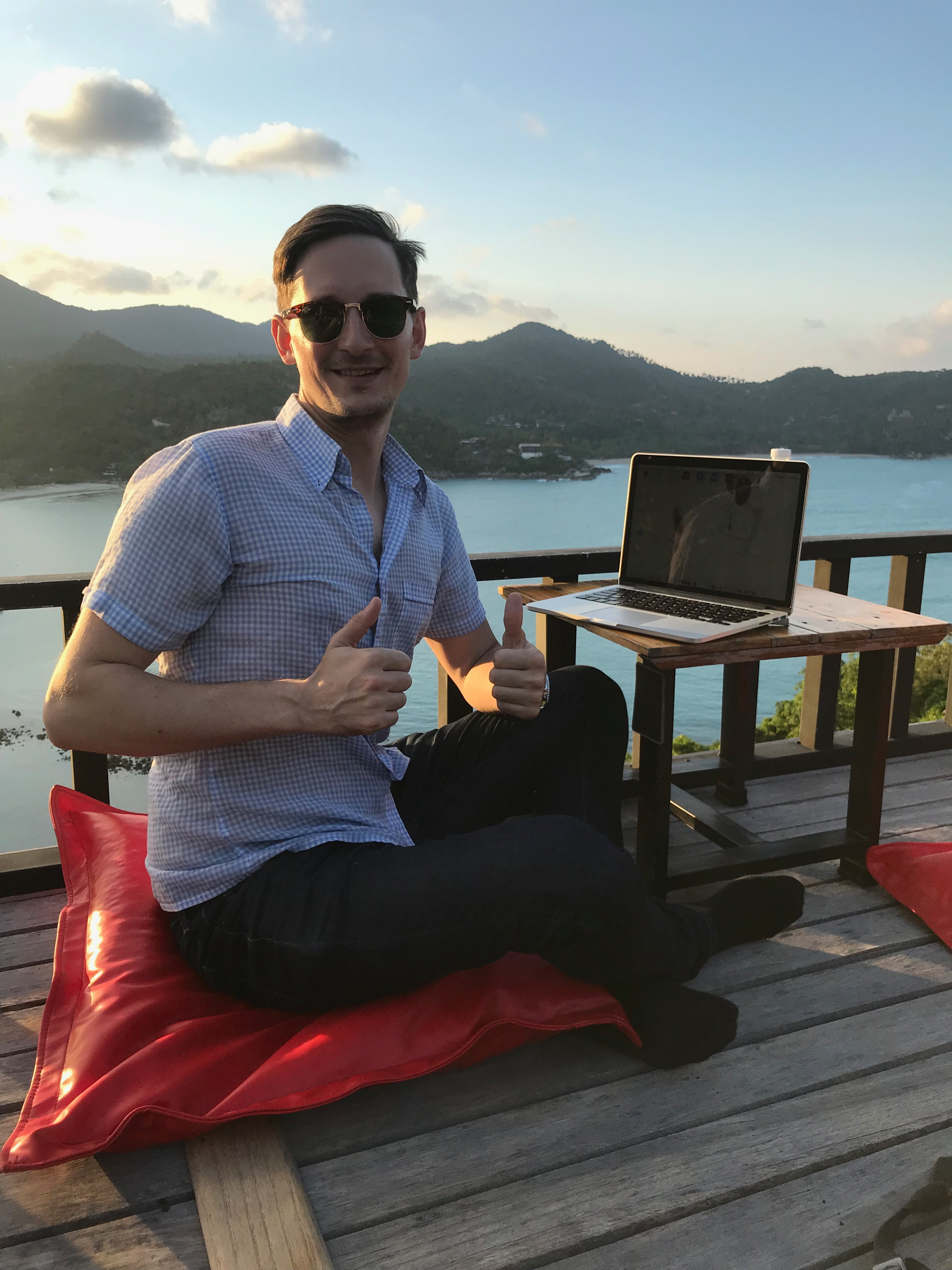
A digital nomad utilizing a mobile workstation on a terrace in Thailand. The lifestyle allows for location independence and the ability to work from diverse environments.

People typically become digital nomads due to a desire to travel, location independence, the lowered cost of living often provided by leaving expensive cities, and if their employer allows it. Cost of living ranks chief among the criteria that digital nomads value when selecting a destination, followed by climate, diversity, and available leisure activities. There are also benefits for employers, as a 2021 study concluded that there is a causal relationship between worker productivity and the option to "work from anywhere," as workers who were freed from geographic limitations showed an average output increase of 4.4% while controlling for other factors. Digital nomads also typically spend more than 35% of their income in the location in which they are staying, an injection of capital that has been shown to stimulate local economies in popular destinations, primarily promoting the service industry and the sale of consumer goods.

== Challenges ==
Although digital nomads enjoy advantages in freedom and flexibility, they report loneliness as their biggest struggle, followed by burnout. Feelings of loneliness are often an issue for digital nomads because nomadism usually requires freedom from personal attachments such as marriage. The importance of developing face-to-face quality relationships has been stressed to maintain mental health in remote workers.

Other challenges include maintaining international health insurance with coverage globally, abiding by different local laws including payment of required taxes and obtaining work visas, and maintaining long-distance relationships with friends and family back home. Digital nomads also very rarely have access to retirement benefits, unemployment insurance, or set time off from work, and often make less money than they could make through traditional employment. As many digital nomads resort to gig work or freelancing, their opportunities for pay can be inconsistent and sporadic. Other challenges may also include time zone differences, the difficulty of finding a reliable connection to the internet, and the absence of delineation between work and leisure time.

There are a few contributing factors to the blurring of this line; certain paid work can be viewed as leisure when it is enjoyable, but many tasks that involve travel and acquiring accommodations can become viewed as another type of work, even though those would traditionally fall into the leisure category. Another issue faced by digital nomads is that of mobility; a travelling worker must be able to keep any necessary equipment with them as they move from location to location, and it is difficult for a digital nomad to manage personal belongings. In fact, many digital nomads do not have a "home base," and must therefore adopt a minimalist lifestyle.

One potentially negative impact of digital nomadism, that does not affect the nomads themselves, is the possibility of 'transnational gentrification.' Concerns have been raised about the nature of the relationship between digital nomads, who are most often from the Global North, and the countries they travel to, generally in the Global South. The problem may arise in regards to housing competition between native people and travelling workers, as well as in personal interactions and the risk of tourism over-dependency. However, the exact scope and real-world impacts of this problem have not yet been settled by research.

== Impact of COVID-19 ==
In 2020, a research study found that 10.9 million American workers described themselves as digital nomads, an increase of 49% from 2019. The primary reason for this rapid increase was office closure and the shift toward remote work due to the COVID-19 pandemic. Multiple countries were prompted to offer new visa programs and to change their policies towards foreign workers as a result of the pandemic.

The pandemic had a larger impact, in terms of mobility, on traditional job holders than on independent workers. While the number of independent workers living as digital nomads increased slightly in 2020, the number of traditional workers who changed their lifestyle to live as digital nomads nearly doubled, from 3.2 million people in 2019 to 6.3 million in 2020. This is because many traditional jobs stopped requiring their employees to physically report to an office or set location everyday, so many people were subsequently able to travel freely while still working.

The majority of this increase consisted of Millennial and Generation Z workers, possibly due in part to their minimized concern about COVID-19. At the same time, another effect of the pandemic was the limited ability to travel, particularly across national borders. For this reason, more and more digital nomads have chosen to remain domestic, especially in the United States. Living as a digital nomad often entails travelling from high-cost areas (e.g. major cities) to cheaper regions (foreign or domestic).

== Legality ==
Many digital nomads prefer to travel on a tourist visa, which is more easily accessible than a working visa is, but which may not allow a visitor to work during their stay, even if for example, the output of such (content creation) were posted online after they departed the territory. Different countries have different permissions regarding remote work for a company based in another country, putting some digital nomads in a legal grey area. Some countries have introduced clear digital nomad visas to cover this grey area, allowing individuals to stay in the country legally while freelancing for international organizations. For example, Estonia offers such visas and allows people to work remotely.

=== Digital nomad visas ===
As of 2026, over 40 countries offer a dedicated digital nomad or remote-work visa, with minimum income requirements ranging from under US$1,000 per month at the low end to over US$7,000 per month for the most restrictive programs.

==== Antigua and Barbuda ====
In 2020, Antigua and Barbuda announced a digital nomad visa called the Nomad Digital Residence (NDR). The visa allows digital nomads who work for a company outside of Antigua and Barbuda to stay in the country for two years.

==== Argentina ====
In May 2022, the Argentinian government announced that it would be implementing a temporary visa targeted at digital nomads. The visa is valid for six months and can be renewed for an additional six.

==== Brazil ====
In January 2022, Brazil introduced the Digital Nomad Visa (VITEM XIV) under Resolution 45/2021, becoming one of the first South American countries to offer a dedicated visa for remote workers. The visa allows foreign nationals employed by companies outside Brazil to reside in the country for one year, renewable for a second year. Applicants must demonstrate a monthly income of at least USD $1,500 or an available bank balance of USD $18,000, along with a remote work contract, health insurance valid in Brazil, and an apostilled criminal background check.

==== Cayman Islands ====
On October 21, 2020, the Cayman Islands launched the Global Citizen Concierge Program. Foreign workers need to have an employment letter from an entity outside of the Cayman Islands and a minimum salary of $100,000.

==== Costa Rica ====
On August 11, 2021, Costa Rica passed a law granting visas to digital nomads. The law allows foreign nationals and their families to live and work in the country for a year, and the visa can be extended for up to one year. The visa requires foreign nationals to have an income greater than US$3000 per month. Families applying for the visa need to have an income greater than US$5000 per month.

==== Croatia ====
In January 2021, Croatia began offering special visas to digital workers from outside of the European Union. The visa allows digital nomads to stay in the country for up to a year while being exempt from paying income taxes.

==== Estonia ====
E-Residency in Estonia was launched in December 2014, allowing remote workers to register their business in Estonia. In 2020, Estonia launched a digital nomad visa, allowing remote workers to live in Estonia for up to a year and legally work for their employer or their own company registered abroad.

==== Georgia ====
In August 2020, Georgia launched a program entitled "Remotely from Georgia." Under the program, citizens from 95 countries can travel and work remotely in the country for at least 360 days without a visa.

==== Hungary ====
In 2022, Hungary introduced the White Card, a residency permit for digital nomads. Under the permit, foreign nationals can live in Hungary while working for a company outside of the country. The permit is for one year and can be extended for an additional year.

==== Iceland ====
In November 2020, Iceland signed an amendment to allow foreign nationals to live in Iceland for up to six months under a long-term visa.

==== Indonesia ====
In June 2022, Indonesia announced plans to introduce a digital nomad visa that would allow remote workers to live in the country tax-free for five years. The announcement was made by the Minister of Tourism, Sandiaga Uno. Uno stated that he hopes to bring up to 3.6 million digital nomads to the country with this plan.

==== Italy ====
In 2022, Italy announced that it would be launching a digital nomad visa. The visa was voted into law on March 28, 2022, as a part of a government decree known as "decreto sostegni ter." The bill remains to be implemented into law, and full details of the digital nomad visa application process and requirements remain unknown.

==== Japan ====
Japan allows foreign nationals to live and engage in remote work there for up to six months under a digital nomad visa. Extensions are not permitted, but the same visa can be granted again six months after the end of the individual's previous stay under the visa.

==== Latvia ====
In February 2022, Latvia's Cabinet of Ministers approved draft amendments to its immigration law to allow third-country nationals to apply for a one-year visa to reside in Latvia while working remotely either for a foreign-registered employer or as self-employed persons.

==== Malta ====
In September 2021, Malta opened applications for its year-long digital nomad visa program. The Malta government stated that the visa can be renewed at the discretion of Residency Malta.

==== Mauritius ====
In February 2022, Mauritius announced that it would be expanding its premium visa to digital nomads. The premium visa allows remote workers to stay in the country for up to a year.

==== Philippines ====
In May 2023, Philippines announced that it will be introducing a one year visa for digital nomads. Nearly two years later in April 2025, President Ferdinand R. Marcos Jr. signed Executive Order No. 86 (EO 86), creating the Philippines’ Digital Nomad Visa (DNV). The Order, which took effect on May 5, 2025, allows qualified foreigners to reside temporarily in the Philippines while continuing to work remotely for employers or clients based outside the country. Shortly thereafter, the Department of Foreign Affairs began accepting applications. Applicants must be at least eighteen years old, demonstrate that they perform their work remotely through digital technology, and show proof of sufficient income from employers or clients located outside the Philippines. The Executive Order does not prescribe a specific income threshold, although immigration consultancies have consistently pointed to approximately US$24,000 in annual foreign-sourced income as a practical benchmark. Applicants must likewise possess health insurance covering the duration of their stay, maintain a clean criminal record, and present no threat to the country’s national security. One important limitation must also be emphasized: holders of a DNV are prohibited from accepting local employment or operating a business in the Philippines. .

==== Portugal ====
In October 2022, Portugal announced it would be accepting applications for Remote Work/Digital Nomad VISAs starting from October 30, 2022. According to the Nomad Report 2023 survey, Portugal is the most popular country for digital nomads with around 16,000 of them residing in the country's capital, Lisbon.

==== Romania ====
On December 21, 2021, Romanian parliament passed legislation for a digital nomad visa. The visa is valid for six months. It can be extended for another six months if foreign workers have proof of full or part-time employment for at least three years prior to their application and have a valid proof of income for the last six months that is three times the Romanian average gross salary.

==== Spain ====
In 2021, Spain announced plans for a digital nomad visa. The law responsible for the digital nomad visa is known as the Startup Law. In December 2021, the law was presented to parliament, and in January 2022, a draft of the law was approved. The Startup Act was approved by parliament in November 2022. In its first ten months, the government has granted 7,368 permits, bringing the total number of digital nomads in Spain to 753,000. According to the law, Digital Nomad Visas in Spain are initially valid for up to 12 months and can be renewed, which will allow digital nomads to reside in Spain for up to five years, and they receive special tax benefits by paying a reduced tax rate.

==== South Africa ====
In March 2022, South Africa announced that it would update its visa laws to be allow digital nomads to stay in the country for more than 90 days.

==== South Korea ====
In January 2024, South Korea announced that it will start conducting a pilot operation of digital nomad (workplace) visa.

==== Taiwan ====
In January 2025, Taiwan began a "digital nomad visitor visa" program. To be eligible for the 180-day visa, applicants must have abided by the terms of a digital nomad visa issued by another country, be citizens of countries that are eligible for 90-day visa-free entry to Taiwan, and submit their resume and work contract for review. Additionally, applicants are required to have bank deposits averaging US$10,000 within the six-month period preceding the visa application, and meet income requirements based on their age. If aged 20–29, applicants must earn a yearly salary of US$20,000 within the past two years. Applicants who are 30 or older must have a yearly salary of US$40,000 within the same two-year period.

Thailand

The Destination Thailand Visa (DTV) is a long-term visa introduced by the Thai government for individuals engaging in remote work, freelancing, and certain cultural or “soft power” activities. It is issued as a five-year, multiple-entry visa. Each entry permits a stay of up to 180 days, with the option to extend once for an additional 180 days. Applicants must be at least 20 years old and demonstrate a minimum balance of 500,000 Thai Baht in financial resources to be eligible.

==== United Arab Emirates ====
In October 2020, the city of Dubai in the United Arab Emirates launched a visa program that allows digital nomads and remote workers to stay in the country for one year. To qualify, foreign workers need at least $5,000 in income per month and a letter confirming employment.

==== Other countries ====
Other countries such as Barbados and Greece offer similar digital nomad visa programmes. Some digital nomads have used Germany's residence permit for the purpose of freelance or self-employment to legalize their stay, but successful applicants must have a tangible connection and reason to stay in Germany. Canada and the United Kingdom explicitly allow both visa-exempt and visa-required tourists to work remotely provided that the remote work does not involve Canadian or British clients respectively and is not the main purpose of their stay.

== See more ==
- Remote work
