= Steven K. Roberts =

American author & technologist

- Born: September 25, 1952 (age 73); Pennsylvania, U.S.
- Occupations: Journalist, writer, archivist, explorer

Steven K. Roberts (born September 25, 1952) is an American journalist, writer, cyclist, archivist, and explorer. He first gained public attention as a pioneering digital nomad, before the term became widely used, when from 1983 to 1991, Roberts toured the United States on three different heavily modified, computerized, recumbent bicycles. It was inspired by an early model Avatar (serial #1) that he rode. This was the Winnebiko from 1983 to 1985, the Winnebiko II from 1986 to 1988, and then the BEHEMOTH. He pulled a trailer equipped with solar panels and other electronic equipment. His journey is documented in his book, Computing Across America.

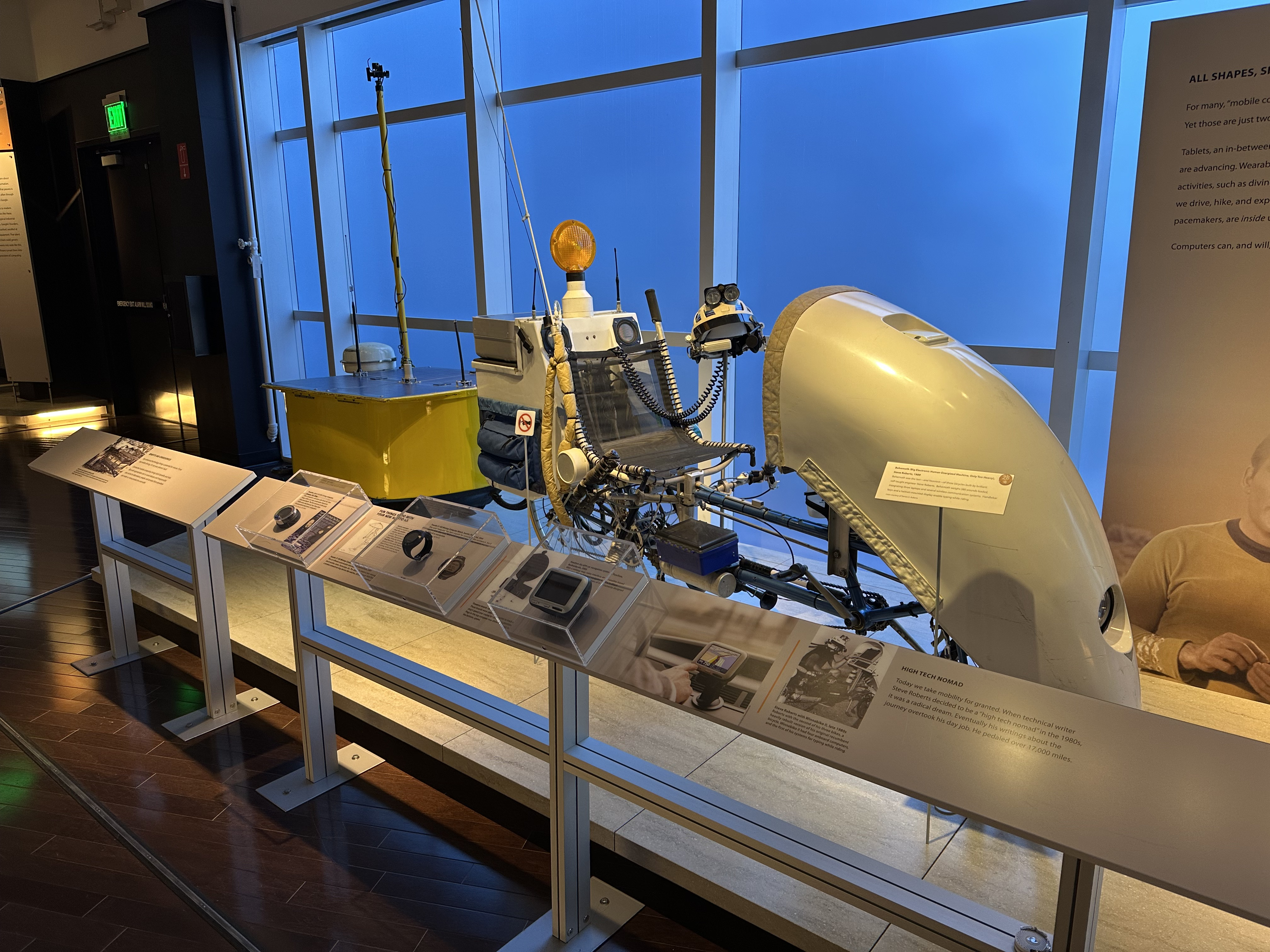
BEHEMOTH Bicycle on display at the Computer History Museum on 6-26-2024 from the front

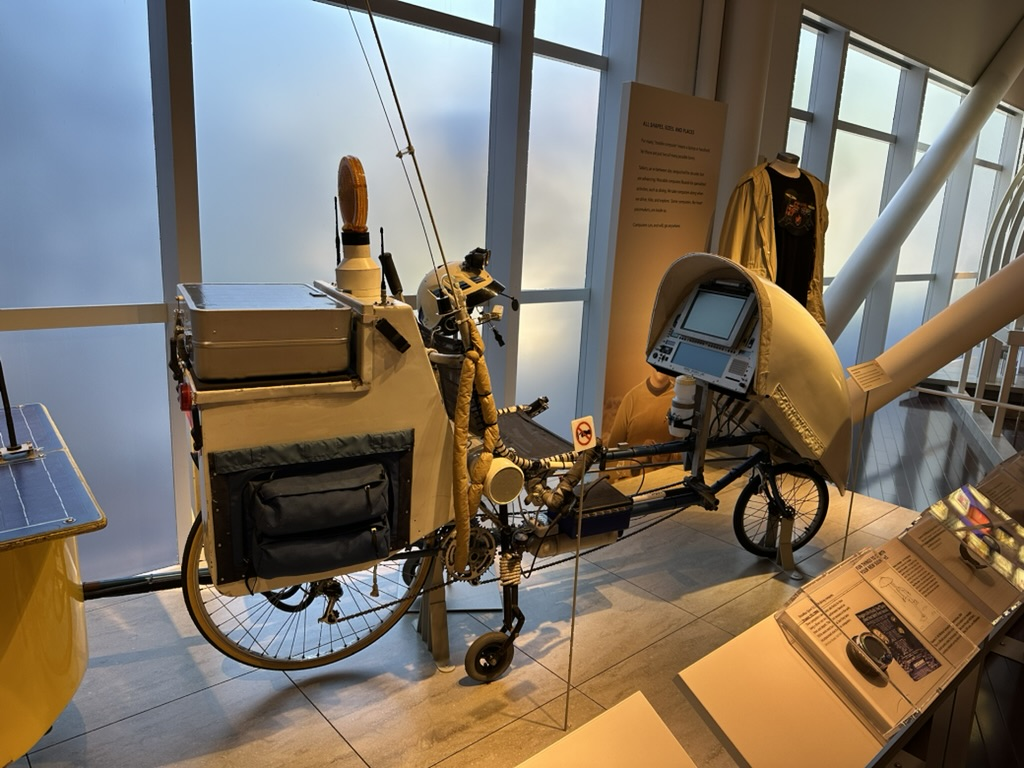
BEHEMOTH Bicycle on display at the Computer History Museum on 6-26-2024 from the back

The first year and a half of his bike tour covered over 10,000 miles. He wrote articles in his tent and filed the pieces via pay phone submitting them to publications like Time and Newsweek. The bike, also known as the BEHEMOTH, had an estimated $300,000 of equipment on it, mostly donated, including satellite email retrieval, a mobile amateur radio station (callsign N4RVE), and a paging system that would page him if an urgent email arrived while he was away from the bike.

After he was featured on the front page of The Wall Street Journal, media coverage accelerated and included a full one-hour appearance on The Phil Donahue Show.

As press attention mounted, he shifted his efforts and built a computerized trimaran. He worked on various iterations of the trimaran for years.

As of 2017, he had turned his efforts into digitizing records, home movies, video tapes, audio recordings, slides, negatives, and various other media, and was living aboard a 50-foot power boat equipped with a 3-D printer, weather station, virtual reality system, electronic piano, 10 ham radios, and more, around 50,000 pounds worth, in Friday Harbor, WA.

As of 2025, he has left the boat, and has his equipment in a 48-foot mobile lab.

== Books ==
- Industrial Design With Microcomputers (ISBN 978-0134594613) 1982
- Creative Design With Microcomputers (ISBN 978-0131893177) 1984 (2nd edition of Industrial Design With Microcomputers)
- Computing Across America: The Bicycle Odyssey of a High-Tech Nomad (ISBN 978-0938734185) Steve describes the wild results of his drastic break with suburban life on his 10,000-mile journey across the United States of America on his computerized bicycle. 1988
- From Behemoth to Microship Steve's journey from computerized recumbent bicycles, Winnebiko and BEHEMOTH to system design and early adventures with the Microships that are amphibian pedal/solar/sail networked folding micro-trimarans. (ISBN 978-1929470006) 2000.
