= Big Electronic Human Energized Machine, Only Too Heavy =

1983 electronic bike

BEHEMOTH Bicycle

The Big Electronic Human Energized Machine, Only Too Heavy (BEHEMOTH) was an electronic bike weighing in at roughly 450 pounds (200 kg). It was created by a multi-disciplinary team of volunteers led by Steve Roberts, a self-taught computer hobbyist, between 1983 and 1991.

== History ==
The BEHEMOTH took three and a half years to build and it involved teams of engineers, machinists, bicycle experts, and chip-makers working in labs and shops across California including Palo Alto, Milpitas, Santa Cruz, Soquel, Scotts Valley, and Mountain View. There were many technologies that were used in this project including but not limited to fiber-glassing, sheet-metal fabrication, machining, FORTH software programming, harsh-environment packaging, networking, power management, embedded systems and audio processing. According to Roberts, the BEHEMOTH was to be a "collection of all the geeky tools that he could imagine, integrated into a limited user interface available while pedaling a bicycle". He envisioned a project where "computer and communication tools rendered physical location irrelevant."

The BEHEMOTH logged over 17,000 miles while in service and demonstrated the integration of technologies for recreational use as a visible artifact of early wireless mobile networking. The BEHEMOTH was donated to the Computer History Museum, where it is currently on display.

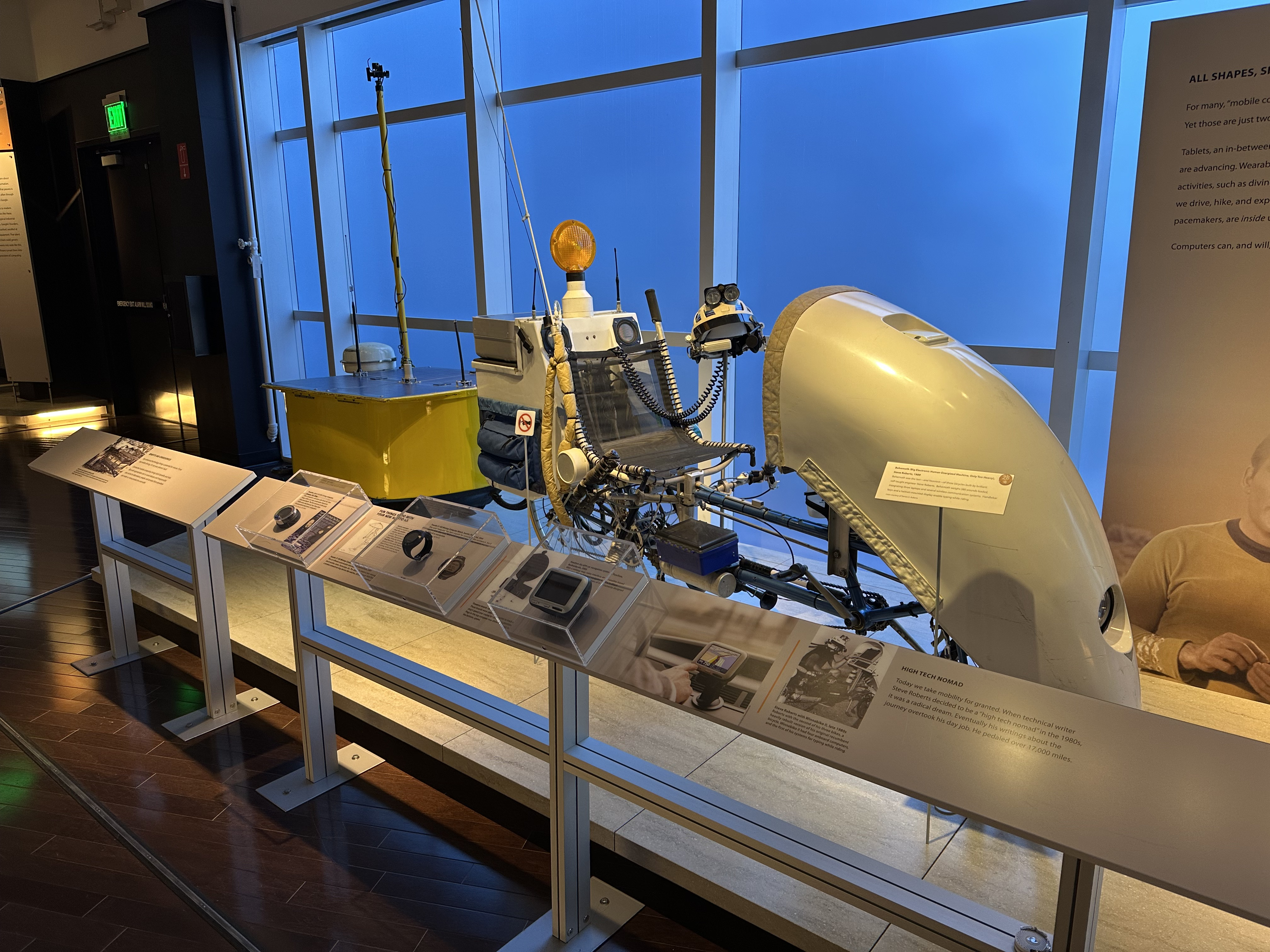
BEHEMOTH Bicycle on display at the Computer History Museum on 6-26-2024 from the front

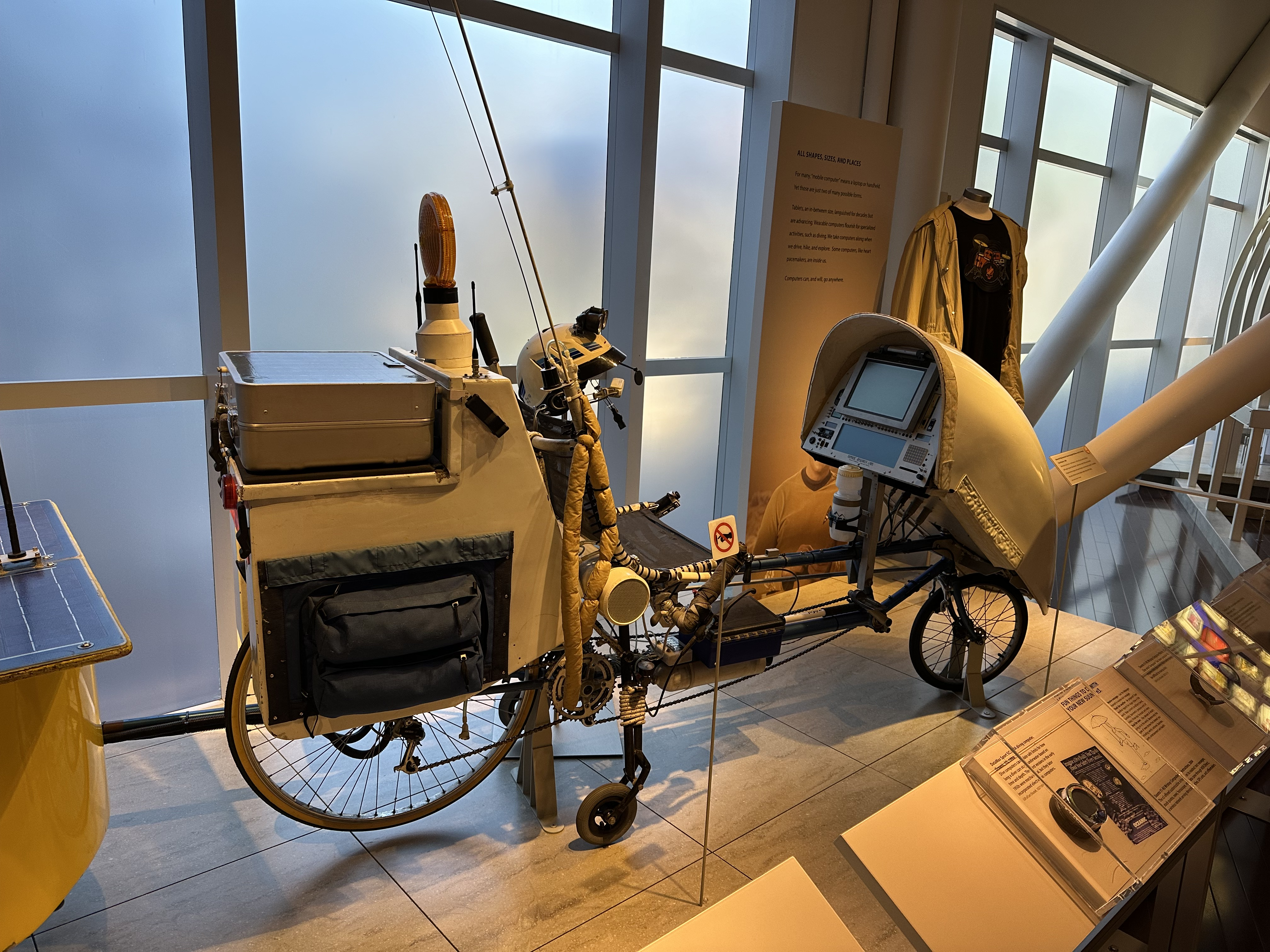
BEHEMOTH Bicycle on display at the Computer History Museum on 6-26-2024 from the rear

== Specification ==
The BEHEMOTH bike contained many of the latest technologies of the time which were packed within the following three main equipment enclosures:

- Console, a fiberglass-enclosed hood located on the front of the bike
- RUMP (Rear Unit of Many Purposes) located behind the bike seat
- Trailer, located at the back of the bike

The console consisted of the following technologies:

- Audio and serial switch networks allowing anything to talk to anything with simple commands
- Bicycle Control Processor which was programmed using the FORTH language
- Cordless phone, answering machine and fax machine
- Credit card verifier
- Diagnostic tools including LED matrix
- Fiberglass dome that was a satellite antenna which provided email connectivity
- Folding 6-segment aluminum console
- Handlebar keyboard on each handle
- Icom 2-meter transceiver; dedicated Larsen half-wave antenna on seat
- Immersive head-up display that was controlled by an Ampro 80286 DOS platform for CAD system
- Macintosh 68K which powered the GUI
- High Frequency (HF) datacomm
- VHF datacomm
- Radiation monitor
- Speech recognition board
- Speech synthesizer which kept the rider current with notifications from the Bicycle Control Unit
- Toshiba 1000 repackaged laptop for scrolling FAQ
- GPS satellite navigation receiver
- Ultrasonic head mouse controller
- 80 MB hard disk drive

The RUMP consisted of the following technologies:

- Air compressor
- Brain-Interface Unit (Helmet)
- Headset with boom microphone
- Helmet-cooling tank and pump
- Helmet lights and cooling system
- Ear-jacks for stereo headphones
- LED taillight switch-mode controller
- Motion sensors for security
- Motorola 9600-baud modem
- Rear-view mirror on swiveled mount
- Reflection Technology Private Eye display
- Rump Control Processor (programmed using the FORTH language)
- Sealed lead-acid battery
- Sharp Color active-matrix display
- Single LED taillight cluster
- Solar panel
- Stereo System
- Sun SPARCstation
- Ultrasonic head-mouse sensors

The trailer consisted of the following technologies:

- Antenna to communicate over various amateur and public radio networks
- Audio filtration and Magic Notch
- Audio crosspoint network, bussed to console
- Automatic CW keyer
- Bike and Frame-Mounted Components
- Bike power management hardware
- Camping, video, camera, personal gear
- Canon BubbleJet printer
- CD player
- Custom recumbent bicycle
- Dual-band VHF/UHF antenna
- Fiberglass-over-cardboard composite structure
- Folding dipole antenna which enabled global coverage on the high frequency amateur radio bands
- Fluke digital multimeter
- Ham Radio station:
- High-brightness LED taillights
- Hydraulic disk brakes
- Icom 725 for HF
- Makita battery charger
- Microfiche documentation and CD library
- Mobile R&D lab
- Pneumatic controls, landing gear, pressure tank, air horn
- Qualcomm OmniTRACS satellite terminal
- Security system pager to alert police if the bike were disturbed
- Technomad Dreams
- Telebit CellBlazer high-speed modem
- Television transceiver
- Telular Celjack RJ-11 interface
- Trailer Control Processor (programmed using the FORTH language)
- Two 15 amp-hour sealed lead-acid batteries
- Under-seat steering
- 72-watt Solarex photovoltaic array
- 105-speed transmission
