= Terry Peake =

American musician

Terry Peake (born April 26, 1980) is an American composer, record producer, multi-instrumentalist and owner of Robot Academy Music.

== Biography ==
Peake was born on April 26, 1980, in Rochester, Michigan, and began learning classical piano at the age of nine. Four years later, he had taught himself how to play guitar. By the time he was 16, he was performing his own compositions with his first band, Nipon. The band developed a following and Terry began to see his success unfold. In 1998, Peake attended Macomb Community College. Two years later, he attended Wayne State University in Detroit, Michigan, where he continued to play and study classical piano, as well as guitar. In 2003, he graduated cum laude with a Bachelor of Music and concentration in composition and music theory. Terry wanted to be able to use classical training in conjunction with his goal of heightening the musical consciousness of popular music audiences. After college, Peake formed the progressive rock band Junecast, for which he also wrote music. This opened yet another door and he began composing music in 2004 for what would eventually be known as Bahamut, which officially formed in 2006. This was a turning point for Peake as he turned his focus to the progressive metal genre as it proposed more of a challenge for him. In 2005, Peake began teaching as a private instructor in addition to composing music. In 2011, he started scoring music for film which has also been a lifelong goal as a writer. In 2012, Peake was recognized specifically for his Bahamut compositions by The Kresge Foundation as a Kresge Artist Fellow and awarded an unrestricted grant in the amount of $25,000. Terry has registered his works as a writer and publisher with the American Society of Composers, Authors and Publishers, and all works are encompassed within his self-created production company Robot Academy Music.

== Awards ==
- Michael Plowman Outstanding Composition Student at Wayne State University in 2002
- Robert F. Lawson Outstanding Music Major at Wayne State University in 2003
- Outstanding Teacher at Axis Music Academy in 2005 and 2006
- 2012 Kresge Arts Fellowship from The Kresge Foundation

== Discography ==
- Nipon, Call of the Rhino (1997)
- Nipon, The Judgement (2001)
- Junecast, Anacrusis (2006)
- Bahamut, The Process (2011)

== Notable performances ==
- Nipon, supporting The Suicide Machines, 1998, Saint Andrew's Hall (Detroit, Michigan)
- Nipon, 2000, Warped Tour (Pontiac, Michigan)
- Bahamut, 2009, Dirtfest (Birch Run, Michigan)
- Bahamut, supporting Deftones, 2010, Orbit Room (Grand Rapids, Michigan)

== Film scores ==
- Certified Super (2011)
- The Halloween Patient (2011)
- Heartifacts (2012)
