= Dot =

A dot is usually a small, round spot.

Dot, DoT or DOT may also refer to:

== Orthography ==
- Full stop or "period", a sentence terminator
- Dot (diacritic), a mark above or below a character (e.g. ȧ, ạ, İ, Ċ, ċ, etc.), usually to indicate sound mutation
- Interpunct (·) also known as an "interpoint", "middle dot", "middot", "centered dot" or "centred dot", a punctuation mark

== Mathematics ==
- "Dot as decimal point", the form of decimal separator generally used in anglophone countries, e.g., $24.99
- Dot operator, a notation used to signify multiplication
- Dot product, algebraic operation returning a single number from two equal-length sequences
- Dot, referring to point, could imply Zero-dimensional space.

== Arts and entertainment ==
- The Dot (Toyism), a work of art in Emmen, the Netherlands
- "Dot" (song), a single by the Los Angeles pop punk band ALL
- "Dot", a song by Destiny's Child featured on the Charlie's Angels soundtrack
- Dot, A Drama in Three Acts, an 1859 stage adaption of the book The Cricket on the Hearth by Charles Dickens
- The Dot (book), a 2003 children's picture book
- Dot (computer), a portable computer
- Dot., a 2013 children's book adapted into a 2016 TV series
- Dot (film), a 2010 British animated short film
- Dot, British radio series written by Ed Harris, first released in 2015
- The Dot (restaurant), a fictional café in Degrassi: The Next Generation
- WTTK, A local television station broadcasting as "The Dot"

== Government agencies ==
- Department of Telecommunications, India
- Department of Tourism (Philippines)
- Department for Transport, UK, formerly the Department of Transport (DoT)
- In Australia:
  - Department of Transport (1930–1932)
  - Department of Transport (1941–1950)
  - Department of Transport (1972–1982)
  - Department of Transport (1983–1987)
  - Department of Transport (1993–1996)
  - Department of Transport (Victoria, 2008–13)
  - Department of Transport (Victoria), established in 2019
  - Department of Transport (Western Australia), 2009–2025
- Department of Transport (South Africa)
- Department of Transportation (New Brunswick), Canada
- United States Department of Transportation
  - Department of transportation, a general list of local and state departments of transportation in the US
- Departure Order Tracking, term used by Citizenship and Immigration Canada
- Taxation Administration, Taiwan

== Technology ==
- Dot (dit), an element in Morse code
- Dot (Unix)
- DOT (graph description language), in computation, the plain-text format for describing graphs used by Graphviz software
- ".", the DNS root zone, the root domain of the Domain Name System
- DoT, DNS over TLS
- DOT code, an alphanumeric character sequence for purposes of tire identification
- Damage over time, in computer and video games
- Designated Order Turnaround or SuperDot, an electronic system used by NYSE to route market orders
- Diffuse optical imaging, also known as diffuse optical tomography, a medical imaging technique
- Directly observed treatment, a way to administer medicine
- Dissolved oxygen tension (DOT)
- Dutch Open Telescope
- The Dot, an Office Assistant, one of several interactive animated characters in Microsoft Office
- Amazon Echo Dot, also called the Dot, part of a brand of smart speakers developed by Amazon
- DOT (mileage system), a German-invented television mileage system
- Dot (camera), a measurement of the subpixels (dots) making up the display image of a camera's LCD

== Places ==
=== Antarctica ===
- Dot Cliff, Victoria Land
- Dot Peak, Oates Land

=== United States ===
- Dot, Kentucky, an unincorporated community
- Dot, Michigan, ghost town
- Lake Dot, in Orlando, Florida
- Dot Island (disambiguation)
- Dorchester, Boston, a neighborhood of Boston, Massachusetts

== People, fictional characters, and mascots ==
- Dot (given name), a list of people and fictional characters
- Pedro Dot (1885–1976), Spanish rose breeder
- Admiral Dot, stage name of Leopold S. Kahn (1859 or 1863–1918), a dwarf performer for P. T. Barnum
- Aditi Saigal or Dot (born 1998), Indian singer and actress
- Dot, one of the mascots of PBS Kids since 1999

== Other uses ==
- Tropical Storm Dot (disambiguation), several tropical storms
- Davao Occidental Tigers, a Filipino basketball team
- Deed of trust (disambiguation), several meanings
- Dictionary of Occupational Titles
- Dot (mango), a cultivar from Florida
- DOT, the cryptocurrency native to Polkadot (blockchain platform)
- Epiphone Dot, a series of archtop guitars

== See also ==
- .dot (disambiguation)
- Dots (disambiguation)
- Dot notation (disambiguation)
- Dotted note, in music notation ( 𝅭 )
- Dot dot dot (disambiguation)
- Two dots (disambiguation)
- Three dots (disambiguation)
- Bullet (typography) (•)
- . (disambiguation)
- Point (disambiguation)
- Period (disambiguation)
