= First period =

First period may refer to:

- First Period architecture, an American architectural style originating between approximately 1626 and 1725
- First menstrual bleeding at Menarche
- First period of the three periods in ice hockey § Periods and overtime
- First period of chemical elements at Period 1 element
- First Period, a concept in Communist ideology discussed at Third Period
- First period as a school period

== See also ==
- Period (disambiguation)
- First Intermediate Period of Egypt, a period in ancient Egyptian history from c. 2181 to 2055 BC
- First Palace Period, a period in Minoan architecture from c. 1925 to 1875 BC
- First Stadtholderless Period, a period in the history of the Dutch Republic from 1650 to 1672
