= Dots =

Dots or The Dots may refer to:

- Dots (candy), produced by Tootsie Roll Industries
- Dots (paper-and-pencil game)
- Dots (video game), a 2013 mobile game produced by Betaworks
- Dots (film), a 1940 short animated film by Norman McLaren
- The Dots (TV series), a 2003–2004 Iranian sitcom
- "Dots" or "Dot Dot Dot", Singlish slangs denoting speechlessness, from Japanese manga
- Paul Kelly and the Dots (1978–1982), an Australian rock band fronted by Paul Kelly
- Dots Miller (1886–1923), American Major League Baseball player

DOTS may be an acronym for:

- Directly observed treatment, short-course, a tuberculosis control strategy recommended by the World Health Organization
- Damage over time, a term used in some popular MMORPG games
- Descendants of the Sun, a 2016 South Korean television series
- Descendants of the Sun (Philippine TV series), a 2020 Philippine television series based on the South Korean series
- Difference of two squares, a mathematical term

== See also ==
- Dot-S, a toy released in Japan
- Dot (disambiguation)
- Two dots (disambiguation)
- Three dots (disambiguation)
  - Ellipsis, a punctuation mark in a form of a series of (usually three) dots
