= Dauer =

Dauer (German for duration) may refer to:

- Jochen Dauer, a former German race car driver, leather magnate, and proprietor of
  - Dauer Sportwagen GmbH, notable for converting Porsche 962 race cars for use on the road as
  - Dauer 962 Le Mans
- Rich Dauer (1952–2025), American baseball player and coach
- Dauer larva
