= Full Stop =

A full stop is a form of punctuation to end a sentence.

Full Stop may also refer to:

== Music ==
- Full Stop (album), a 2000 album by Annabelle Chvostek
- "Full Stop" (G.E.M. song) (2019)
- "Full Stop" (IU song) (2017)
- "Full Stop", a song by Frank Klepacki
- "Ful Stop", a song by Radiohead from A Moon Shaped Pool

== Other uses ==
- Full stop law, an Argentine law passed in 1986 to stop prosecution of people accused of political violence
- Full Stop, a campaign by the National Society for the Prevention of Cruelty to Children
- Full stop, an increment of factor of two of a camera lens aperture area
- Full stop, a complete halt by a motor vehicle, as opposed to a rolling stop

== See also ==
- Period (disambiguation)
- Point (disambiguation)
- Dot (disambiguation)
- . (disambiguation)
