= Instructograph =

Morse code study aid

The Instructograph was a paper tape-based machine used for the study of Morse code.

== Overview ==
The paper tape mechanism consisted of two reels which passed a paper tape across a reading device that actuated a set of contacts which changed state dependent on the presence or absence of hole punches in the tape. The contacts could operate an audio oscillator for the study of International Morse Code (used by radio), or a sounder for the study of American Morse Code (used by railroads), or a light bulb (Aldis Lamp - used by Navy ship to ship or by Heliograph).

== Development ==
The Instructograph was in production from about 1920 through 1983. The first US patent, No. 1,725,145, was granted to Otto Bernard Kirkpatrick, of Chicago, IL, on August 20, 1929. Most of them would be wound by hand or be plugged into a wall outlet. Most plugin outlet based instructographs would have a set of knobs that can control the speed and volume.

The latest version of the Instructograph was the model 500 which included a built in solid state oscillator. This model was available to be purchased as new through at least 1986.

== See also ==
- Hog-Morse
