= Two dots =

The term two dots or double dot may refer to:

== Orthography ==
- Colon (punctuation), the punctuation mark (:)
- Two dots (diacritic), a mark used with a base letter to indicate that its pronunciation is somehow modified (◌̈ ◌̤)
  - Diaeresis (diacritic), the diacritic mark used to denote the separation of two consecutive vowels
  - Umlaut (diacritic), the diacritic mark to indicate the vowel-fronting sound change
    - Metal umlaut, gratuitous diacritic used in the names of some rock bands
- Ethiopic wordspace (፡), a word divider in Geʽez script
- In old Turkic script, a colon-like symbol (U+205A ⁚ TWO DOT PUNCTUATION) is sometimes used as a word separator
- Question mark § History, two vertical dots used to indicate a question in fifth century Syriac manuscripts
- A rare two-dot form of the ellipsis (..)

== Other ==
- Two Dots (game), a puzzle game for Android and IOS
- Leader (typography) Row of dots used in tables of contents (usually more than two)
- Ellipsis (computer programming), a notation (two or three dots) is used to denote programming ranges, an unspecified number of arguments
- A parent directory in a relative path
- A second derivative in Newton's notation
- A double-dotted note in Western musical notation

== See also ==
- Semi-colon, the punctuation mark (;)
- Dot (disambiguation)
- Three dots (disambiguation)
