= Dot dot dot =

Dot dot dot may refer to:

- DOT DOT DOT (artist), Norwegian artist
- Dot Dot Dot (magazine)
- Ellipsis (…), a punctuation symbol
- Morse code for the letter "s"
- "Dot Dot Dot", a 2026 song by Natasha Bedingfield

== See also ==
- Three dots (disambiguation)
