= Table of contents =

Ordered list of the parts of a written work

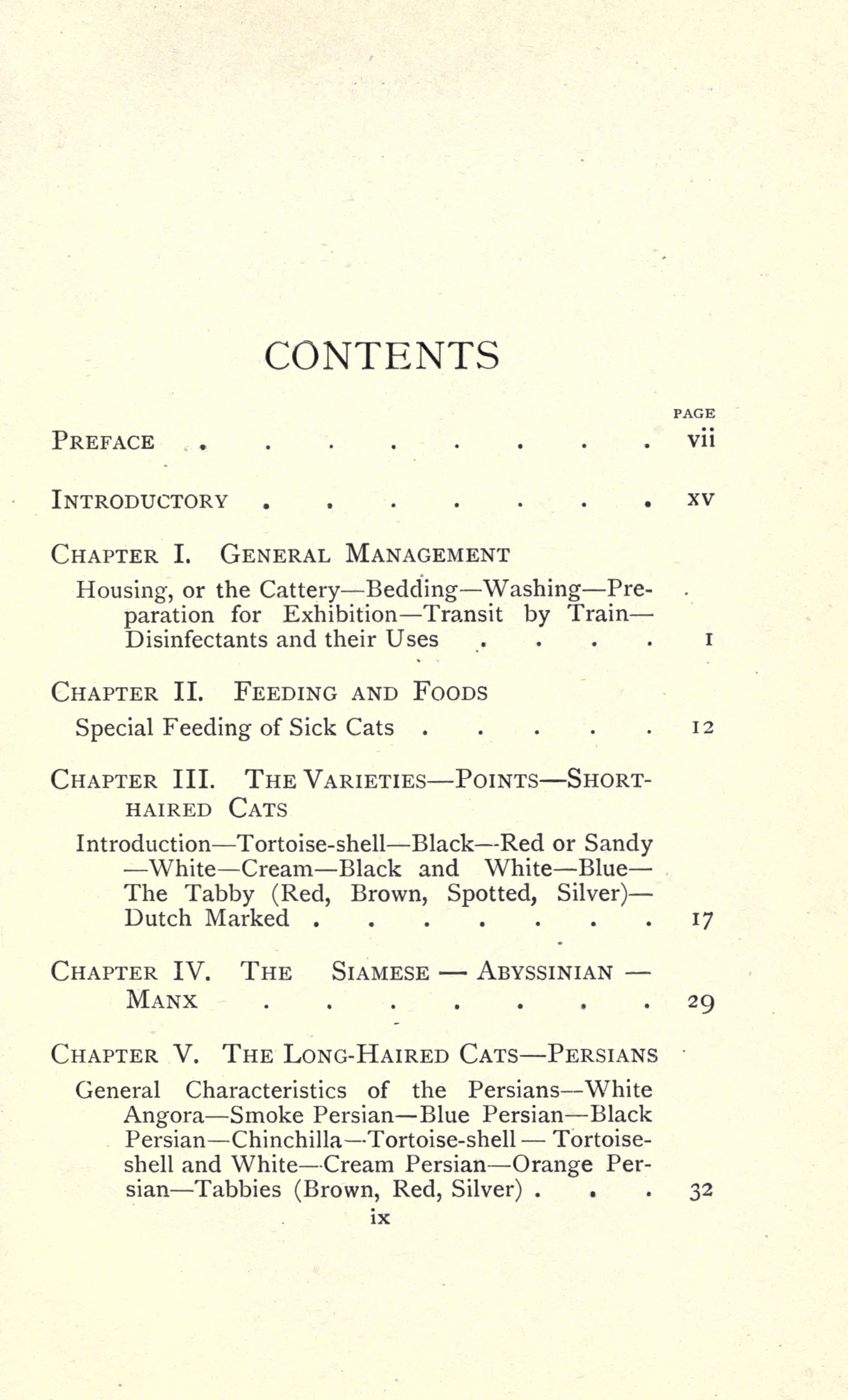
A table of contents from a book about cats with descriptive text

A table of contents (or simply contents, abbreviated as TOC), is a list usually part of the front matter preceding the main text of a book or other written work containing the titles of the text's sections, sometimes with descriptions.

== History ==
Pliny the Elder credits Quintus Valerius Soranus (d. 82 BC) as the first author to provide a table of contents to help readers navigate a lengthy work.

=== Classical Origins ===
The Roman writer Quintus Valerius Soranus (d. 82 BCE) is credited as the first to attach a list of contents to a written work, according to the Roman historian Pliny the Elder. In his Natural History, Pliny writes: "Soranus was the first to include a list of his book's chapters to help the reader understand its content." (Note: Pliny's own table of contents for his encyclopedic Historia naturalis ("Natural History") may be viewed online in Latin and in English (following dedication).)

=== In Indian and Chinese Civilizations ===
In ancient Sanskrit literature, works such as the Sushruta Samhita and the Charaka Samhita (1st century BCE) were systematically divided into books and chapters, which were often listed at the beginning. In China, during the Han to Tang dynasties (206 BCE – 907 CE), classification catalogues began to appear in official records. One example is the Hanshu (Book of Han), which organized works by topic and included early content tables.

=== Byzantine and Early Christian Contributions ===
Early Christian tradition employed reference tables known as Canon Tables, compiled by Eusebius of Caesarea in the 4th century CE. These helped readers navigate between the four Gospels and are considered among the earliest tools resembling tables of contents.

=== In Islamic civilization ===
With the flourishing of writing and scholarship during the Abbasid era (9th century CE), Muslim scholars began dividing their books into chapters and sections, often listed in the preface or at the beginning of each chapter. Notable examples include works by Avicenna, al-Jahiz, and Ibn al-Nadim in his encyclopedic Al-Fihrist. Taha Hussein referred to this structure as a precursor to the modern table of contents: "Al-Jahiz would often include tentative headings for his chapters, offering readers a glimpse into the discussion—a primitive form of the contents page."

=== Influence on Europe ===
The transmission of knowledge during the Islamic Golden Age, particularly through Al-Andalus and Sicily, exposed Latin Europe to Arab methods of organizing texts. Historian George Saliba notes that Europeans not only translated scientific content but also adopted Arab formatting and presentation methods.

=== Europe After the Printing Press ===
After the invention of the printing press by Johannes Gutenberg in the 15th century, organizing printed texts with clear tables of contents became increasingly necessary, which then became standard in the following centuries.

As printing technology expanded beyond Europe, the structural organization of books—including the use of tables of contents—was transmitted through colonial, commercial, and intellectual exchanges.

== Form ==
The depth of detail in tables of contents depends on the length, complexity, and type of work. For books and most other large written works, tables of contents come after the title page, copyright page, and if appropriate, dedication and epigraph pages. Although they include everything after it, tables of contents never include anything before it. Depending on the complexity or length of the text, the table of contents will include the parts (groups of chapters), if applicable, chapters or section headings, and sometimes chapter or section subheadings.

Formal reports (ten or more pages and being too long to put into a memo or letter) also have a table of contents. Within an English-language book, the table of contents usually appears after the title page, copyright notices, and, in technical journals, the abstract; and before any lists of tables or figures, the foreword, and the preface.

Printed tables of contents indicate page numbers where each part starts, while digital ones offer links to go to each part. The format and location of the page numbers is a matter of style for the publisher. If the page numbers appear after the heading text, they might be preceded by characters called leaders, usually dots or periods, that run from the chapter or section titles on the opposite side of the page, or the page numbers might remain closer to the titles. In some cases, the page number appears before the text.

In the case of anthologies or other compilations of works by different authors, each section's contributors are usually listed along with the title of the section.

Matter preceding the table of contents is generally not listed there. However, all pages except the outside cover are counted, and the table of contents is often numbered with a lowercase Roman numeral page number.

== In electronic documents ==
Many popular word processors, such as LibreOffice Writer, Microsoft Word and WordPerfect are capable of automatically generating a table of contents if the author of the text uses specific styles for chapters, sections, subsections, etc.

TOCs in digital books and documents can be created using bookmarks.

== Examples ==
Example with leaders:

Chapter 1: Getting Started . . . . . . . . . . . . . 1
   Introduction  . . . . . . . . . . . . . . . . . . 2
   Next Steps  . . . . . . . . . . . . . . . . . . . 3

Example without leaders:

Chapter 1: Getting Started   1
   Introduction   2
   Next Steps   3

Example with authors:

1. Introduction to Biology  Arthur C. Smith   1
2. Microbiology  Susan Jones   10
3. Advances in Biotechnology  T.C. Chang   24

Example with descriptive text:

Chapter 1                                           3
   In which we first meet our hero and heroine, attend
   a gala feast, and begin an unexpected journey.

Chapter 2                                          12
   The journey takes an unusual turn, and new villains
    are discovered.

== Gallery ==
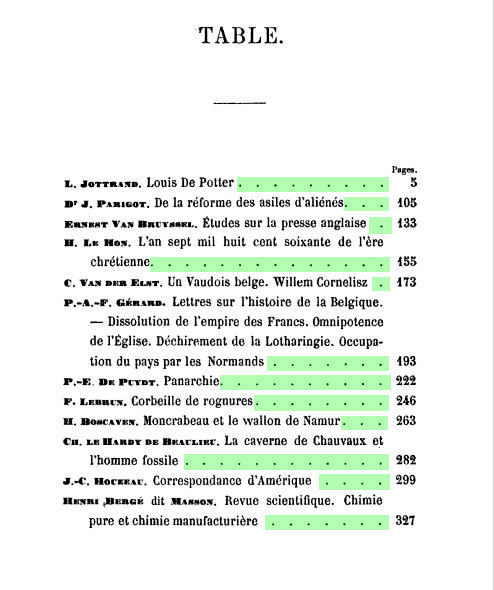
A table of contents with leaders highlighted in green

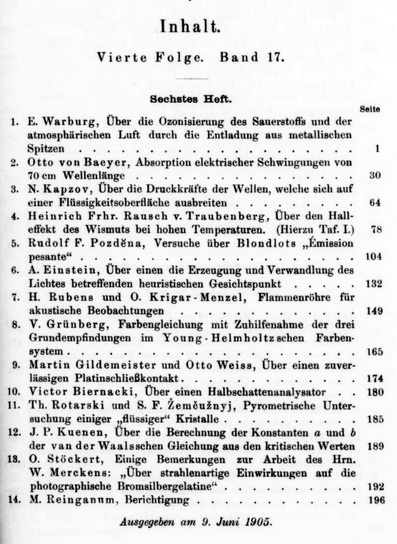
The table of contents of the scientific journal Annalen der Physik (Annals of Physics) from June 1905. Albert Einstein's groundbreaking paper on the photoelectric effect is sixth on this list.

== See also ==
- Index (publishing)
- Bookmark
  - Bookmark (digital)
