= . (disambiguation) =

. or similar, may refer to:

- A grapheme of a point or dot
- Decimal point ("," or "."), a character used in forming numbers with whole and partial value parts
- Full stop, full point, or, period ("."), a punctuation character
- Interpunct, middot, or, centred-dot ("·"), a punctuation character
- Bullet (typography) ("•"), a punctuation character from starting a list point
- Dot (diacritic), a dot or point that lies above or below a letter, forming an accented letter
- Stipple, a dot for forming graphics
- . (album), by Kesha

== See also ==
- Full stop (disambiguation)
- Period (disambiguation)
- Point (disambiguation)
- Dot (disambiguation)
