= Words per minute =

Measure of writing, typing, or reading speed

Words per minute (commonly abbreviated as WPM and sometimes lowercased as wpm) is a measure of words processed in a minute, often used as a measurement of the speed of typing, reading or Morse code sending and receiving.

== History ==
The first researcher who took notice of differences in reading speed and extensively wrote on the matter was George Romanes, he went on to claim in his book Mental Evolution in Animals that he found readers who read four times as fast as others of apparently the same intelligence. J.O. Quantz came across his work and decided to write a study, and later publicize the results, where he made a distinction between very slow and very rapid readers. The former had a reading rate of 3.9 words per second (234 wpm), the latter a rate of 7.3 words per second (438 wpm). Moreover, he also noted that quickness of perception, with its large physiological element, is an important factor in deciding one's rate of reading and that speed reading ultimately results in a sacrifice (or exactness) of intelligence. He however attributed these findings to general intelligence, which would later become g factor.

Due to the fact that Quantz did not publicize his methodology, Edmund B. Huey wrote a separate article on reading speed, and came up with a series of tests, where eleven pages, containing 405 words were selected from an interesting novel which would be read by the readers. Huey would then measure the time with a stopwatch and find that the average silent reading speed, using Huey's standardized method is 5.91 words per second (355 wpm), Auditory was at 5.12 (307 wpm) and reading aloud 3.55 words per second (213 wpm). The slowest reader had a segmental affection of the retina, which undoubtedly affected his speed. The next slowest reader was a Japanese student.

Miles Tinker was the first psychologist to publish multiple articles on reading speed and reading comprehnesion, he used the Chapman-Cook Speed of Reading test. It had two forms, each containing 30 paragraphs of 30 words. Toward the end of the paragraph there was an awkward word spoiling the paragraph. Participants had to tick off the word and finish as many paragraphs as possible in 1.75 min. An example of a paragraph was: "Yesterday I went downtown to buy some shoes and rubbers, but when I got home, I found I had forgotten to go to the flower-store to get them". University undergraduates typically finished some 18 paragraphs (540 words) in 1.75 min, making a reading speed of 316.3 wpm for roman, and 294.5 for italic. With a standard deviation of 61.4 and 72.4 respectively. He also noted that material read in lower cases was read 13.4 percent faster than in all capital letters

== Alphanumeric entry ==
Since words vary in length, for the purpose of measurement of text entry the definition of each "word" is often standardized to be five characters or keystrokes long in English, including spaces and punctuation. For example, under such a method applied to plain English text the phrase "I run" counts as one word, but "rhinoceros" and "let's talk" would both count as two.

Karat et al. found in one study of average computer users in 1999 that the average rate for transcription was 32.5 words per minute, and 19.0 words per minute for composition. In the same study, when the group was divided into "fast", "moderate", and "slow" groups, the average speeds were 40 wpm, 35 wpm, and 23 wpm, respectively.

With the onset of the era of desktop computers and smartphones, fast typing skills became much more widespread. Using physical keyboards, professional typists type at speeds of 43 to 80 wpm, while some positions can require 80 to 95 (usually the minimum required for dispatch positions and other time-sensitive typing jobs), and some advanced typists work at speeds above 120 wpm. Some typists have sustained speeds over 300 wpm for a 15-second typing test with simple English words.

Two-finger typists, sometimes also referred to as "hunt and peck" typists, commonly reach sustained speeds of about 37 wpm for memorized text and 27 wpm when copying text, but in bursts may be able to reach much higher speeds. From the 1920s through the 1970s, typing speed (along with shorthand speed) was an important secretarial qualification, and typing contests were popular and often publicized by typewriter companies as promotional tools.

As of 2019, the average typing speed on a mobile phone was 36.2 wpm with 2.3% uncorrected errors—there were significant correlations with age, level of English proficiency, and number of fingers used to type.

== Stenotype ==
Stenotype keyboards enable the trained user to input text as fast as 360 wpm at very high accuracy for an extended period, which is sufficient for real-time activities such as court reporting or closed captioning. While training dropout rates are very high—in some cases only 10% or even fewer graduate—stenotype students are usually able to reach speeds of 100–120 wpm within six months, which is faster than most alphanumeric typists. Guinness World Records gives 360 wpm with 97.23% accuracy as the highest achieved speed using a stenotype.

== Numeric entry ==
The numeric entry or 10-key speed is a measure of one's ability to manipulate the numeric keypad found on most modern separate computer keyboards. It is used to measure speed for jobs such as data entry of number information on items such as remittance advice, bills, or checks, as deposited to lock boxes. It is measured in keystrokes per hour (KPH). Many jobs require a certain KPH, often 8,000 or 10,000.

== Handwriting ==
For an adult population (age range 18–64) the average speed of copying is 68 letters per minute (approximately 13 wpm), with the range from a minimum of 26 to a maximum of 113 letters per minute (approximately 5 to 20 wpm).

A study of police interview records showed that the highest speed fell in the range 120–155 characters per minute, the highest possible limit being 190 characters per minute.

According to various studies the speed of handwriting of 3–7 graders varies from 25 to 94 letters per minute.

Using stenography (shorthand) methods, this rate increases greatly. Handwriting speeds up to 350 words per minute have been achieved in shorthand competitions.

== Reading and comprehension ==
Words per minute is a common metric for assessing reading speed and is often used in the context of remedial skills evaluation, as well as in the context of speed reading, where it is a controversial measure of reading performance. There are moreover, two components that are assumed to be crucial for successful reading: decoding and comprehension. Skill in decoding is usually accompanied by skill in comprehension, more than often however there are instances of a deficiency in coding, which is usually found among people with dyslexia. hyperlexia is characterized by the ability to quickly decode text, with comprehension lagging behind. The existence of this condition is taken by some to show that since skill in decoding need not be accompanied by skill in reading, decoding cannot be crucial to reading. Both of which are usually measured in speed reading tests..

A word in this context is the same as in the context of speech.

Research done in 2012 measured the speed at which subjects read a text aloud, and found the typical range of speeds across 17 different languages to be 184±29 wpm or 863±234 characters per minute. However, the number of wpm varied between languages, even for languages that use the Latin or Cyrillic alphabets: as low as 161±18 for Finnish and as high as 228±30 for English. This was because different languages have different average word lengths (longer words in such languages as Finnish and shorter words in English). However, the number of characters per minute tends to be around 1000 for all the tested languages. For the tested Asian languages that use particular writing systems (Arabic, Hebrew, Chinese, Japanese) these numbers are lower.

Scientific studies have demonstrated that reading—defined here as capturing and decoding all the words on every page—faster than 900 wpm is not feasible given the limits set by the anatomy of the eye.

While proofreading materials, people are able to read English at 200 wpm on paper, and 180 wpm on a monitor. [Those numbers from Ziefle, 1998, are for studies that used monitors prior to 1992. See Noyes & Garland 2008 for a modern tech view of equivalence.]

== Speech and listening ==
Audiobooks are recommended to be 150–160 words per minute, which is the range that people comfortably hear and vocalize words.

Slide presentations tend to be closer to 100–125 wpm for a comfortable pace, auctioneers can speak at about 250 wpm, and the fastest speaking policy debaters speak from 350 to over 500 words per minute. Internet speech calculators show that various things influence words per minute including nervousness.

An example of an agglutinative language, the average rate of Turkish speech is reported to be about 220 syllables per minute. When the time spent for the silent parts of speech are removed, the so-called average articulation rate reaches 310 syllables per minute. The average number of syllables per (written) word has been measured as 2.6. For a comparison, Flesch has suggested that the conversational English for consumers aims 1.5 syllables per word, although these measures are dependent on corpus.

John Moschitta Jr. was listed in Guinness World Records, for a time, as the world's fastest speaker, being able to talk at 586 wpm. He has since been surpassed by Steve Woodmore, who achieved a rate of 637 wpm.

== Sign language ==
In the realm of American Sign Language, the American Sign Language University (ASLU) specifies a cutoff proficiency for students who clock a signing speed of 110-130 wpm.

== Morse code ==
Morse code uses variable length sequences of short and long duration signals (dits and dahs, colloquially called dots and dashes) to represent source information e.g., sequences for the letter "K" and numeral "2" are respectively ( ▄▄▄ ▄ ▄▄▄ ) and ( ▄ ▄ ▄▄▄ ▄▄▄ ▄▄▄ ). This variability complicates the measurement of Morse code speed rated in words per minute. Using telegram messages, the average English word length is about five characters, each averaging 5.124 dot durations or baud. Spacing between words should also be considered, being seven dot durations in the US and five in British territories. So the average British telegraph word was 30.67 dot times. So the baud rate of a Morse code is 50/60 × word per minute rate.

It is standard practice to use two different such standard words to measure Morse code speeds in words per minute. The standard words are: "PARIS" and "CODEX". In Morse code "PARIS" has a dot duration of 50, while "CODEX" has 60.

Although many countries no longer require it for licensing, Morse is still widely used by amateur radio ("ham") operators. Experienced hams routinely send Morse at 20 words per minute, using manually operated hand telegraph keys; enthusiasts such as members of The CW Operators' Club routinely send and receive Morse code at speeds up to 60 wpm. The upper limit for Morse operators attempting to write down Morse code received by ear using paper and pencil is roughly 20 wpm. Many skilled Morse code operators can receive Morse code by ear mentally without writing down the information at speeds up to 70 wpm. To write down the Morse code information manually at speeds higher than 20 wpm it is usual for the operators to use a typewriter or computer keyboard to enable higher speed copying.

In the United States a commercial radiotelegraph operator's license is still issued, although there is almost no demand for it, since for long-distance communication ships now use the satellite-based Global Maritime Distress and Safety System. Besides a written examination, proficiency at receiving Morse at 20 wpm plain language and 16 wpm in code groups must be demonstrated.

High-speed telegraphy contests are still held. The fastest Morse code operator was Theodore Roosevelt McElroy copying at 75.6 wpm using a typewriter at the 1939 world championship.

== See also ==
- Keyboard layout
- Instructograph
- Keystroke dynamics
- Morse code
- Speed typing contest
- Touch typing
