= Trust deed =

Trust deed or deed of trust may refer to:

- Deed of trust (real estate), as distinguished from the general concept of a deed
- Trust instrument, a legal instrument in common law systems
- Trust Deed (Protected), used in Scottish law
