= Lake Dot =

Lake in the state of Florida, United States

- Location within Florida Location within the United States
- Location: Orlando, Florida
- Coordinates: 28°33′08″N 81°23′12″W
- Type: natural freshwater lake
- Basin countries: United States
- Max. length: 730 feet (220 m)
- Max. width: 700 feet (210 m)
- Surface area: 5.42 acres (2 ha)
- Surface elevation: 82 feet (25 m)

Lake Dot or is a 5.42-acre (21,900 m^{2}) natural freshwater lake located in central Orlando, Florida. Lake Dot, a nearly round lake, is in the Lake Dot neighborhood of the city. It is in a completely urbanized area with homes and businesses surrounding it. A fountain is near the center of this lake. The north side of the lake is bounded by Colonial Drive, a very busy thoroughfare. It appears a small portion of the lake was filled in to allow Colonial to run in a straight line. On the south is Concord Street and on the east and west sides, Lake Dot is bordered by Lake Dot Circle.

Lake Dot is surrounded by Lake Dot Park, a thin strip of public land between the lake's edge and the surrounding roads. This strip is wider along the south. While this park is noted in maps of the city of Orlando, it not noted as an official park. There is no information about the types of fish in this lake. There is no swimming or boating allowed at this lake.
