= Dot (computer) =

1983 portable computer model

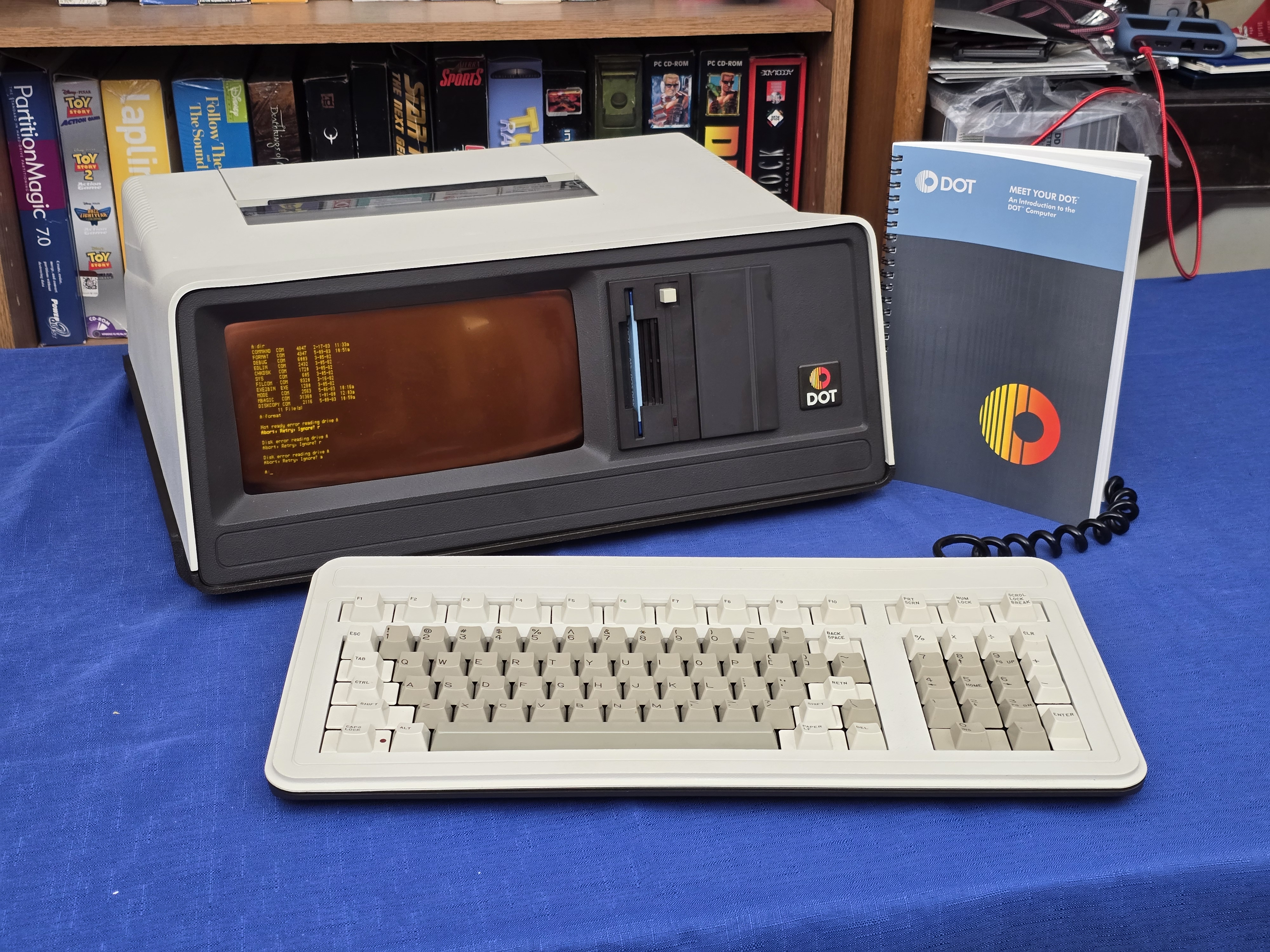
- Developer: Computer Devices, Inc.
- Manufacturer: Computer Devices, Inc.
- Type: Portable computer
- Released: April 1983
- Discontinued: 1984
- Units shipped: At least 2,000–3,000
- CPU: Intel 8088; Z80 (optional)
- Memory: 32–704 KB of RAM

The Dot, styled as DOT is a portable computer released by Computer Devices, Inc. (CDI) in April 1983. It has an Intel 8088 processor and up to 704 KB of RAM, while its screen is capable of producing graphics at a resolution of up to 1024 by 254 pixels. Not fully IBM PC compatible, the Dot was a commercial failure and was a major factor in CDI's Chapter 11 bankruptcy in November 1983.

== Specifications ==
The Dot's primary microprocessor is an Intel 8088, although customers could have optionally purchased a Z80 expansion board that allows it to run CP/M. The computer has 32 KB of RAM stock (expandable to 704 KB); a 9-inch-wide, 5-inch-tall CRT monitor; and one 3.5-inch floppy disk drive manufactured by Sony, inventors of the format. Options included MS-DOS as a native operating system; a dual serial port card; a second 3.5-inch floppy drive; a thermal printer that attaches to the top of the computer; a 300/1200-baud modem; and an Intel 8087 floating-point co-processor. The video card supports rendering graphics at pixel resolutions of 640 x 200 or 1024 x 254, while the optional thermal printer can output 132-line text, for a perfect facsimile of the computer's text display mode.

== Release and market failure ==
The Dot was announced in fall 1982 and released in April 1983, the company establishing a national dealer network the month prior to release. The Dot was intended to be the breakout microcomputer product for Computer Devices, Inc. (CDI), a successful manufacturer of computer terminals based out of Burlington, Massachusetts. Despite possessing the same Intel 8088 as the IBM PC as well as being shipped with MS-DOS (functionally equivalent to IBM's PC DOS), the Dot is not fully IBM PC compatible. Demand for the Dot was low, and by December 1983 only between 2,000 and 3,000 units had been sold. CDI announced two large layoffs after the computer's failure and other complications in the company, the first in August 1983, the second in October 1983. CDI filed for Chapter 11 bankruptcy the following month.

The Dot's failure and Computer Device's bankruptcy were highly publicized, as it came amid amid concurrent bankruptcy filings from other technology companies including Osborne Computer Corporation, another portable computer manufacturer whose Osborne 1 was the first commercially successful portable computer. Unlike Osborne, CDI survived bankruptcy and continued into the next decade as a software developer for specialized applications. The company dissolved in October 1998.
