= Dot (song) =

Single by All

from the album Percolater
- B-side: "A Boy Named Sue"; "Can't Say"
- Released: 1992
- Studio: Chapman Recording Studios, Kansas City, Missouri; Nightingale Studio, Nashville, Tennessee; Ardent Studios, Memphis, Tennessee
- Genre: Punk rock
- Length: 6:19
- Label: Cruz (CRZ-024)
- Songwriter: Scott Reynolds
- Producers: Bill Stevenson, Stephen Egerton

All singles chronology
"She's My Ex" (1989)	"Dot" (1992)	"Shreen" (1994)

Audio sample
- file; help

"Dot" is a song by the American punk rock band All, written by singer Scott Reynolds and released as a single and music video from the band's 1992 album Percolater. The single also includes the song "Can't Say", written by bassist Karl Alvarez and drummer Bill Stevenson, and a cover version of "A Boy Named Sue", a 1969 song written by Shel Silverstein and made famous by Johnny Cash.

== Background ==
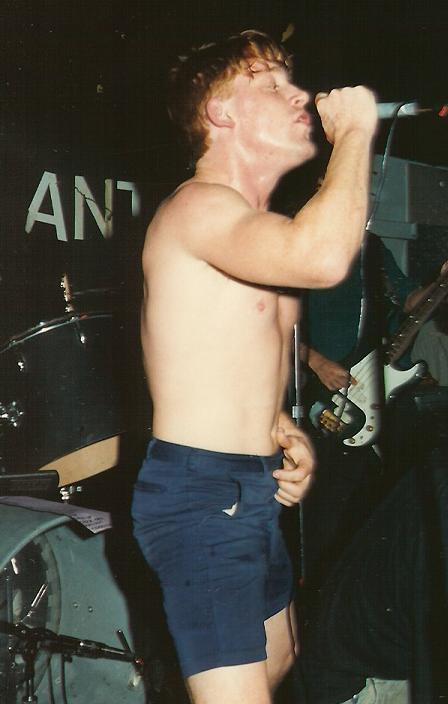
"Dot" was written by singer Scott Reynolds.

"Dot" was recorded with the rest of Percolater at Chapman Recording Studios in Kansas City, Missouri and at Nightingale Studio in Nashville, Tennessee. Stevenson and guitarist Stephen Egerton served as record producers and additional recording engineers. The recordings were mixed by John Hampton at Ardent Studios in Memphis, Tennessee. "Can't Say" and "A Boy Named Sue" were also recorded during the Percolater sessions but were left off of the album. "Dot" was released through Cruz Records in 1992 as a 10-inch single, cassette single, and CD single.

The music video for "Dot" shows the band members performing the song on a set made to resemble the interior of a house, with Reynolds using various props related to the song's lyrics such as a telescope, telephone, and mirror. Stevenson did not think "Dot" was the strongest choice of song for a music video. Reynolds later recalled that "When we went to record the 'Dot' video, it was really apparent that Bill was dissatisfied. He wasn't happy". "At that point I was idealizing we would put our foot forward visually with a song that maybe had more of an eighth note drive to it," said Stevenson, "but on that record I didn't have really any good songs, so it's like 'Okay, a lot of lip from you, Stevenson. Where's your good song?' And it's like 'I don’t have any.'"

== Reception ==
Deborah Orr of CMJ New Music Report said "'Dot' is classic All, whizzy and boiling over with happy punk sentiments." Mike DaRonco of Allmusic focused his comments on the single's others songs, saying "'Can't Say' has the same heartfelt lyrics and all-around goofiness that All are known for. But what makes the single worthwhile is their rendition of Johnny Cash's 'A Boy Named Sue': just listening to the normally high-pitched voice of Scott Reynolds trying to do his best Man in Black imitation is a scream."

== Track listing ==
No.	Title	Writer(s)	Length
1.	"Dot"	Scott Reynolds	2:00
2.	"A Boy Named Sue" (originally performed by Shel Silverstein)	Shel Silverstein	2:16
3.	"Can't Say"	Karl Alvarez (music and lyrics), Bill Stevenson (music)	2:03
Total length:			6:19

== Personnel ==
Band

- Karl Alvarez – bass guitar
- Stephen Egerton – guitar, additional engineering, producer
- Scott Reynolds – vocals
- Bill Stevenson – drums, additional engineering, producer

Production

- E – additional engineering
- Erik Flettrich – additional engineering
- John Hampton – mixing engineer
- Rich Hanson – additional engineering
- G.E. Teel – additional engineering
