= Period =

Period may refer to:

== Common uses ==
- Full stop, a punctuation mark commonly used to end a sentence (.)
- Era, length or span of time
  - Periodization, classifying particular lengths of time into distinct historiographic or artistic periods
  - List of time periods
  - History by period
- Menstruation, commonly referred to as a "period"

== Arts, entertainment, and media ==
- Period (music), concept in musical composition
- Periodic sentence or rhetorical period, concept in grammar and literary style
- Period drama, dramatic film or television production set in a historical period
- . or Period (album), by Kesha
- Period (mixtape), by City Girls
- Period, novel in Dennis Cooper's George Miles cycle
- Periods., comedy film series

== Mathematics ==
- In a repeating decimal, the length of the repetend
- Period of a function, length or duration after which a function repeats itself
- Period (algebraic geometry), numbers that can be expressed as integrals of algebraic differential forms over algebraically defined domains, forming a ring

== Science ==
- Period (gene), gene in Drosophila involved in regulating circadian rhythm
- Period (periodic table), horizontal row of the periodic table
- "Period-" or "per-iod-", chemical prefix where "per" refers to oxidation state and "iod" refers to iodine
- Unit of time or timeframe
  - Period (geology), subdivision of geologic time
  - Period (physics), the duration of time of one cycle in a repeating event
  - Orbital period, the time needed for one object to complete an orbit around another
  - Rotation period, the time needed for one object to complete a revolution
- Wavelength, the spatial period of a periodic wave
- Sentence (linguistics), especially when discussing complex sentences in Latin syntax

== Other uses ==
- Period (school), block of time allocated for a specific course or other purpose
- Playing period, a division of playing time in games and sport
  - Period (ice hockey)
- Accounting period, often shortened to "period" in business, an accounting timeframe analogous to a month
- Periodt, slang of period used as an interjection

== See also ==
- . (disambiguation)
- Duration (disambiguation)
- Full stop (disambiguation)
- Periodicity (disambiguation)
