= .dot =

.dot may refer to:

- .dot, file extension of DOT of the Graphviz project
- .dot, file extension of a Microsoft Word template
