= Dot Island =

Dot Island may refer to:

- Dot Island (South Georgia) 54°3′S 37°20′W
- Dot Island in Lake Yellowstone
  - list of islands of Wyoming
