= Duration =

Duration may refer to:

- Duration (time), the amount of time elapsed between two events
- Duration of action, how long a drug produces its effects
- Duration (finance) – the weighted average time until the various cash flows from a security, such as a bond, are received
- Duration (music) – an amount of time or a particular time interval, often cited as one of the fundamental aspects of music
- Duration (philosophy) – a theory of time and consciousness first proposed by Henri Bergson
- For duration in phonetics and phonology (the feature of being pronounced longer) see Length (phonetics)

== See also ==
- Period (disambiguation)
