= Dot notation =

Dot notation may refer to:

- Newton's notation for differentiation (see also Notation for differentiation)
- Lewis dot notation also known as Electron dot notation
- Dot-decimal notation
- Kepatihan notation
- Dotted note
- DOT language

Dot notation is also used in:

- Lisp (programming language)
- Object-oriented programming as syntactic sugar for accessing properties.
- Earley algorithm

== See also ==
- Dot convention
