= Friedrich Clemens Gerke =

German journalist (1801–1888)

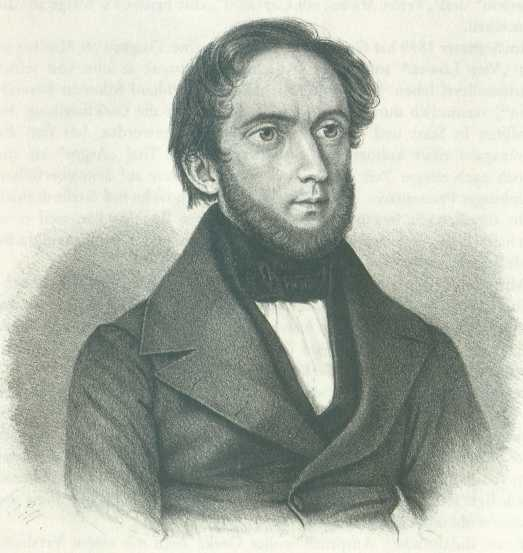
Friedrich Clemens Gerke, 1840

Friedrich Clemens Gerke (22 January 1801 – 21 May 1888) was a German writer, journalist, musician and pioneer of telegraphy who revised the Morse code in 1848. It is Gerke's version of the original (American) Morse code now known as the International Morse code and standardized by the ITU (International Telecommunication Union) which is used today.

== Life ==
Gerke was born in Osnabrück and grew up in modest circumstances. At the age of 16, he came to Hamburg as a servant and houseboy to the private scientist Arnold Schuback. In 1818, he became a clerk with Senator Brunnemann, and received a fixed wage for the first time in his life. On 10 July 1820 he married Sophie Marianne Duclais, a young, non wealthy French immigrant. They tried to establish a hatter business, but it soon failed and went into bankruptcy. They then decided to emigrate, like many other Europeans in the 19th century, and planned to join the British Army. Via Twielenfleth (Lower Saxony) and the Isle of Heligoland in the German Bight, they went to Canada in 1820, and Gerke served as a musician in the Rifle Battalion, 60th Regiment. He played the clarinet and horn.

Gerke did not enjoy being in the military service, and he managed to find someone else to take his place in the army. He subsequently returned to Hamburg in 1823.

== Optical and electrical telegraph ==
In the years before Gerke joined the optical and later the electrical telegraph, he worked as a musician in pubs and establishments for sailors on the Reeperbahn. This area of Hamburg was under Danish administration in those days. He also started a career in writing and journalism and published many articles about social life and criticized misgovernment. Gerke wrote several books about life in general, nature, and healthcare. After some years he terminated his musical profession because he earned enough money from his writings.

From 1838 on he joined the optical telegraph of Johann Ludwig Schmidt, who established a private telegraph line between Hamburg and Cuxhaven. Gerke's first job was to fix their technical problems. This optical telegraph line served as a ship reporting system between Cuxhaven at the Elbe estuary and the some 120 km further upstream port of Hamburg. In 1842, the year of the 'Great Hamburg Fire', he requested help from neighbouring fire brigades using the optical telegraph.

By request of the Hamburg Senator Carl Möhring, the Americans William and Charles Robinson demonstrated their electrical Morse telegraph. Recognizing the great advantages of the new technology, Gerke defected to the Elektro-Magnetische Telegraph Companie which started its regular service on 15 July 1848 between Hamburg and Cuxhaven. Gerke became inspector of this company, which for the first time in Europe used Morse code on landlines.

== Revision of Morse's Code ==
Gerke perceived the disadvantages of the American Morse code and changed nearly half of it into its present form, the International Telegraph Alphabet. The original Morse code consisted of four different hold durations (the amount of time the key was held down), and some letters contained inconsistent internal durations of silence. In Gerke's system there are only "dits" and "dahs", the latter being three times as long as the former, and the internal silence intervals are always a single dit-time each. This improved code was adopted by the Deutsch-Oesterreichischer Telegraphenverein in 1851 and by the International Telegraph Union in 1865 (in slightly modified form) as International Morse Code.

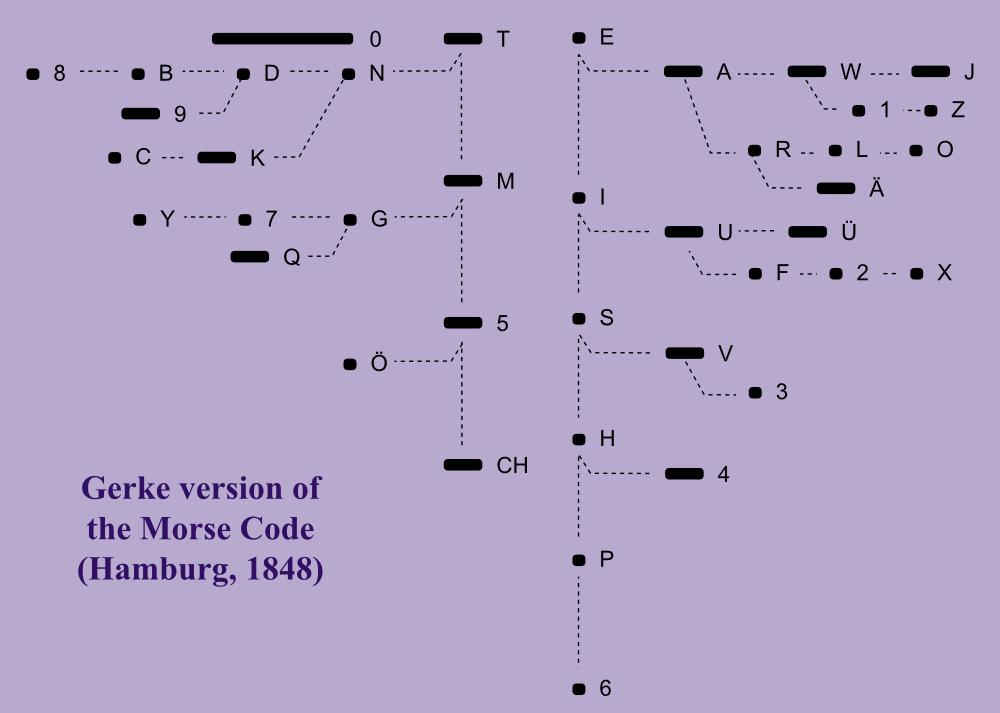
Morse Code in Gerke coding

== Later years ==
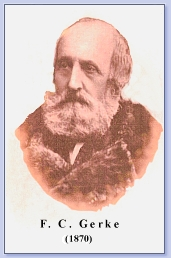

In 1850 his wife Marianne died; they had no children. A short time later he married a much younger woman, Friedericke Wilhelmine Tietz, with whom he had 5 children.

From 1868 on, Gerke worked with the then built Hamburger Telegraph Office and became its first director.

On 21 May 1888 Gerke died in Hamburg and was buried on the Hamburg Ohlsdorf cemetery. The grave was given up by the family in the 1930s.
