= Three dots =

Three dots can refer to:

- 3 Dots, a 2013 Indian Malayalam-language film
- Because sign (∵), a shorthand form of the word "because"
- Dinkus, commonly represented as three asterisks (* * *) or three large dots ("bullets") (• • •), usually refers to a section break in written text
- Ellipsis (... or . . . or U+2026 … HORIZONTAL ELLIPSIS [style guides vary]), indicates an intentional omission of a word
  - Leader (typography), may be represented with three dots or ellipses
- The letter S in Morse code
- Therefore sign (U+2234 ∴ THEREFORE), a shorthand form of the word "therefore" or "thus"
  - List of Masonic abbreviations#Typography describes the same symbol being used in Freemasonry for a different purpose
- In standard Japanese map symbols, U+26EC ⛬ HISTORIC SITE indicates a historic site.
  - In standard Japanese map symbols, a similar but more spaced-out three-dot triangle indicates a tea plantation.
- In meteorological station models, three dots in an upward-pointing triangle indicates moderate rain.
- U+20DB ◌⃛ COMBINING THREE DOTS ABOVE character is a combining diacritical mark for symbols. When used after U+0020 SPACE, it is used in mathematical notations (and represented with the "tdot" or "TripleDot" entities in HTML 5.0 and MathML 3.0)
- In music notation, a triple-dotted note is a note with three dots written after it
- The rest operator in JavaScript; the splat operator in PHP
- Three Dots Tattoo, a prison tattoo in North America
- The vertical ellipsis (⋮)
- The characters U+2E2A ⸪ TWO DOTS OVER ONE DOT PUNCTUATION and U+2E2B ⸫ ONE DOT OVER TWO DOTS PUNCTUATION have square dots and are included in the Unicode Supplemental Punctuation block.

== See also ==
- Dot (disambiguation)
- Two dots (disambiguation)
- Asterism (typography) (⁂), indicates a flourished section break in a document
- āytam (ஃ), a Tamil letter which is neither a vowel nor a consonant
  - Aayutha Ezhuthu, a 2004 Indian film by Mani Ratnam
