= Period (school) =

Block of time in a school schedule

A school period is a block of time allocated to particular classes, courses or lessons in schools. They typically last between 30 and 60 minutes, with around 3-10 periods per school day. However, especially in higher education, there can be many more. Educators determine the number and length of these periods, and may even regulate how each period will be used. One common example of this practice is to designate at least one compulsory period a day for physical education.

== Free period ==
One special example of a period is the free period. These are typically shorter than regular periods and allow students to participate in non-class activities. A free period (also called a spare, unstructured, or leisure period) is generally found in most high schools and colleges. Depending on the institution, students may utilize a free period for various purposes:

- Walk around the campus freely until the next period. Some high schools permit students to be free of adult supervision, leave the campus and go home, visit shops or areas nearby that are outside the school grounds, or otherwise do anything that complies with campus rules and the law.
- Stay in a designated study room or classroom to talk, work on homework, or study for any upcoming exams.
- Use it as an opportunity to meet up with teachers and ask about missed work or other questions.
- In some schools, lunch is also consumed during a student's free period.
- Some tired students can take a nap until next period.

Some schools have an extended lunch period that can be used as a free period as well.

In the university setting, "free period" can refer to any time period that a student is not enrolled in a class.

== Study period ==
Another special example of a middle school and high school period is the study period. In school or college, a study period is a period in a student's timetable where a student may undertake self-directed learning activities, rather than having lessons being taught by a teacher.

While study periods are normally intended for study activities, such as set exercises, problem solving, or homework, students often consider these periods of the school day as free periods and may use the time to socialize rather than study. For this reason, study periods may often be supervised by a teacher being present in the study room. In some instances, the teacher may even tutor the students, and the study period may become a tutorial, although this is not normally the case. Study periods often occur because of scheduling conflicts in the school timetable, when there is a mismatch between available students, teachers, subjects and classrooms.

Study periods are generally monitored by teachers or teacher's aides, who often encourage students to use this time to complete homework, catch up on missing assignments, or study for tests or quizzes. Sometimes, students also use periods to converse, make phone calls, text message, play video games, or otherwise socialize or pursue non-academic topics, though this is often discouraged or forbidden. Periods in which such things are allowed are occasionally differentiated from study periods by the name "free period". Some students even eat lunch during a study period due to long lines and short lunch periods at their schools.

Study periods are often used by students to visit with teachers, who have a "prep period", in order to discuss work or assignments.

Many academics feel that study period is an inefficient allocation of time which is often underutilized, but others say it is a positive addition to a regular schedule because it creates a good environment for completing homework or large projects.
