= Hog-Morse =

Garbled telegraph message from a novice operator

Hog-Morse was telegraphers' jargon for the tendency of inexperienced telegraph operators to make errors when sending or receiving in Morse code. The term was current in the United States during the period when American Morse code was still in use.

It is so called after one example (here given in International Morse but most likely originating in American Morse):

▄ ▄ ▄ ▄ ▄▄▄ ▄▄▄ ▄▄▄ ▄▄▄ ▄▄▄ ▄ (HOME)

becomes

▄ ▄ ▄ ▄ ▄▄▄ ▄▄▄ ▄▄▄ ▄▄▄ ▄▄▄ ▄ (HOG),

with just one subtle error in timing.

== Examples ==
The now-defunct American Morse ("railroad code") is different from the International Morse Code currently in use for radio telegraphy. With American Morse it was far more difficult to avoid timing errors, because there were more symbol timings than there are in International Morse and some were difficult to distinguish because of their closeness; International Code has only two symbols, dots ( ▄ ) and dashes ( ▄▄▄ ), but the American code has three lengths of dash and two lengths of spaces between dots.

For example, the dashes used for "L" ( ▄▄▄▄ ) and "T" ( ▄▄ ) in American Morse are distinct. Also, in International Morse the space between symbols within a character is always the same, but American Morse has two different spaces. For example, the letters "S" ( ▄ ▄ ▄ ), "C" ( ▄ ▄ ▄ ), and "R" ( ▄ ▄ ▄ ) all consist of three dots, but with slightly different timing between the dots in each case.

A frequently quoted, but possibly apocryphal, story from the historical period concerns the similarity of L ( ▄▄▄▄ ) and T ( ▄▄ ) in the American code. A company in Richmond, Virginia received a request for quotation for a load of undressed staves (rough sawn wood intended for the manufacture of barrels), but the telegraph operator had sent

▄ ▄ ▄ ▄▄▄▄ ▄ ▄▄ ▄ ▄ ▄ ▄▄ ▄ ▄ ▄ ▄ (slaves)

instead of

▄ ▄ ▄ ▄▄ ▄ ▄▄ ▄ ▄ ▄ ▄▄ ▄ ▄ ▄ ▄ (staves)

thus sending an order for undressed slaves. The company replied reminding the customer that slavery had been abolished.

Another American Morse example given in the literature is please fill me in becoming 6naz fimme q. One commentator has called this the 19th century autocorrect.

Example of an American Morse code message becoming corrupted with incorrect element timings
