= Leader (typography) =

Row of dots used in tables of contents

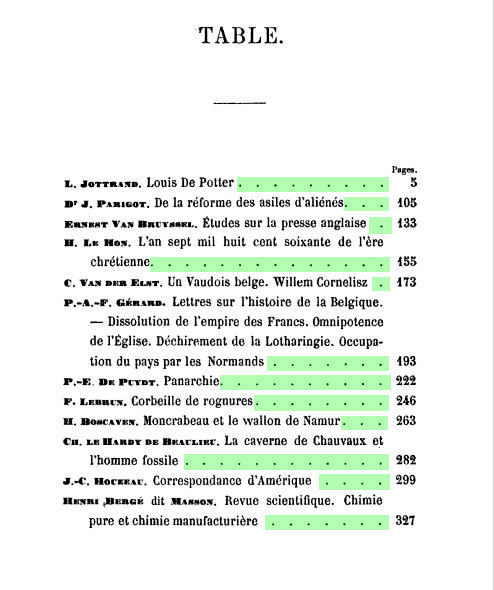
A table of contents with the leaders highlighted in green

A leader in typography is a series of characters, usually lines of dots or dashes, that are used as a visual aid to connect items on a page that might be separated by considerable horizontal distance. For example, dot leaders are often used in tables of contents to connect section headings with the page numbers on which those sections begin.

Most word processing software includes a feature for the automatic generation of dot leaders.

This word is pronounced /ˈliːdər/ LEED-ər, like the everyday word "leader" (person who leads), unlike the typographical term leading (/ˈlɛdɪŋ/ LED-ing), which refers to the use of the metal lead.

== In typesetting ==
In conventional typesetting (metal, photosetting, and digital composition before PostScript), the en leader character—a period glyph horizontally centered within the set width of an en space—was commonly used to produce an ellipsis or (sometimes with added space) a leader line as in tabular matter such as a table of contents.

== In Unicode ==
Although manual dot leaders are often represented as a series of periods, there are at least three Unicode characters dedicated to the representation of dot leaders. These are U+2024 ․ ONE DOT LEADER, U+2025 ‥ TWO DOT LEADER, and U+2026 … HORIZONTAL ELLIPSIS, a three dot leader.

Unicode lacks an en leader.
