= List of international common standards =

A list of international common and basic technical standards, which have been established worldwide and are related by their frequent and widespread use. These standards are conventionally accepted as best practice and used globally by industry and organizations.

In circumstances and situations there are certain methods and systems that are used as benchmarks, guidelines or protocols for communication, measurement, orientation, reference for information, science, symbols, and synchronising time. These standards are employed to universally convey meaning, classification and to relate details of information.

The standards listed may be educational, voluntary guidelines, informal standards, or formal regulation, which might not be recognised by all governments or organizations.

== Communication ==
- Braille
- International Code of Signals
- International Maritime Signal Flags
- International Phonetic Alphabet

In radio communications

- Radiotelephony procedure
- Procedure word
- International Radiotelephony Spelling Alphabet
- Aeronautical Code signals
- Maritime Mobile Service Q Codes
- Standard Marine Communication Phrases
- Brevity code
- Q code
- Call sign

In electronics

- Unicode

== Agriculture & Manufacturing ==
- Codex Alimentarius, food production
- Good Manufacturing Practice, regulations for pharmaceuticals and other products
- ISO 216 or A4 paper
- ISO 45001 Occupational Health and Safety Management Systems

== Measurement ==
- International System of Units
- Standard mathematical notation
- Metric system

== Reference for information ==
- Barcode
- International Standard Book Number
- QR code
- Uniform resource locator
- vCard

In geographical location

- Cartography
- Geotagging
- Geographic coordinate system

== Science ==
- Electromagnetic spectrum
- International Classification of Diseases
- Medical classification
- Periodic table

== Symbols ==
- Chemical symbols
- Hazard symbol
- International Symbol of Access

In electronics

- Electronic symbols, for circuit diagrams
- Media control symbols
- Power symbol

== Time ==
- Time zones
- Universal Time

== See also ==
- Communication protocol
- Index of standards articles
- International Communication Association
- International Electrotechnical Commission
- International Organization for Standardization
- International regulation
- List of symbols
- Lists of spoken and written languages
- Substitute flag
