= Pressure altimeter =

Barometric tool

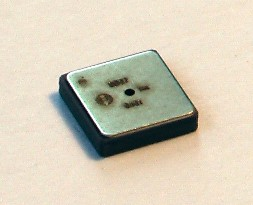
Digital barometric pressure sensor for altitude measurement in consumer electronic applications

Altitude can be determined by the measurement of atmospheric pressure. The greater the altitude, the lower the pressure. When a barometer is supplied with a nonlinear calibration so as to indicate altitude, the instrument is a type of altimeter called a pressure altimeter or barometric altimeter. A pressure altimeter is the altimeter found in most aircraft, and skydivers use wrist-mounted versions for similar purposes. Hikers and mountain climbers use wrist-mounted or hand-held altimeters, in addition to other navigational tools such as maps, magnetic compasses, and receivers for global navigation satellite systems (GNSS), such as GPS.

== Calibration ==
The calibration of an altimeter follows the equation

$z=c\;T\;\log(P_o/P),$

where c is a constant, T is the absolute temperature, P is the pressure at altitude z, and P_{o} is the pressure at sea level. The constant c depends on the acceleration of gravity and the molar mass of the air. However, one must be aware that this type of altimeter relies on "density altitude" and its readings can vary by hundreds of feet owing to a sudden change in air pressure, such as from a cold front, without any actual change in altitude.

The most common unit of measurement used for altimeter calibration worldwide is hectopascals (hPa), except in North America and Japan, where inches of mercury (inHg) are used. To obtain an accurate altitude reading a pressure altimeter must be calibrated to local barometric pressure by use of the barometric formula.

== History ==
The scientific principles behind the pressure altimeter were first written by Rev. Alexander Bryce, a Scottish minister and astronomer who in 1772 realised that the principles of a barometer could be adjusted to measure height.

== Applications ==
=== Use in hiking, climbing and skiing ===
A barometric altimeter, used along with a topographic map, can help to verify one's location. It is more reliable, and often more accurate, than a global navigation satellite systems (GNSS) receiver (such as a GPS receiver) for measuring altitude; the GNSS signals may be unavailable, for example, when one is deep in a canyon, or it may give wildly inaccurate altitudes when all available satellites are near the horizon. Because barometric pressure changes with the weather, hikers must periodically re-calibrate their altimeters when they reach a known altitude, such as a trail junction or peak marked on a topographical map.

=== Skydiving ===
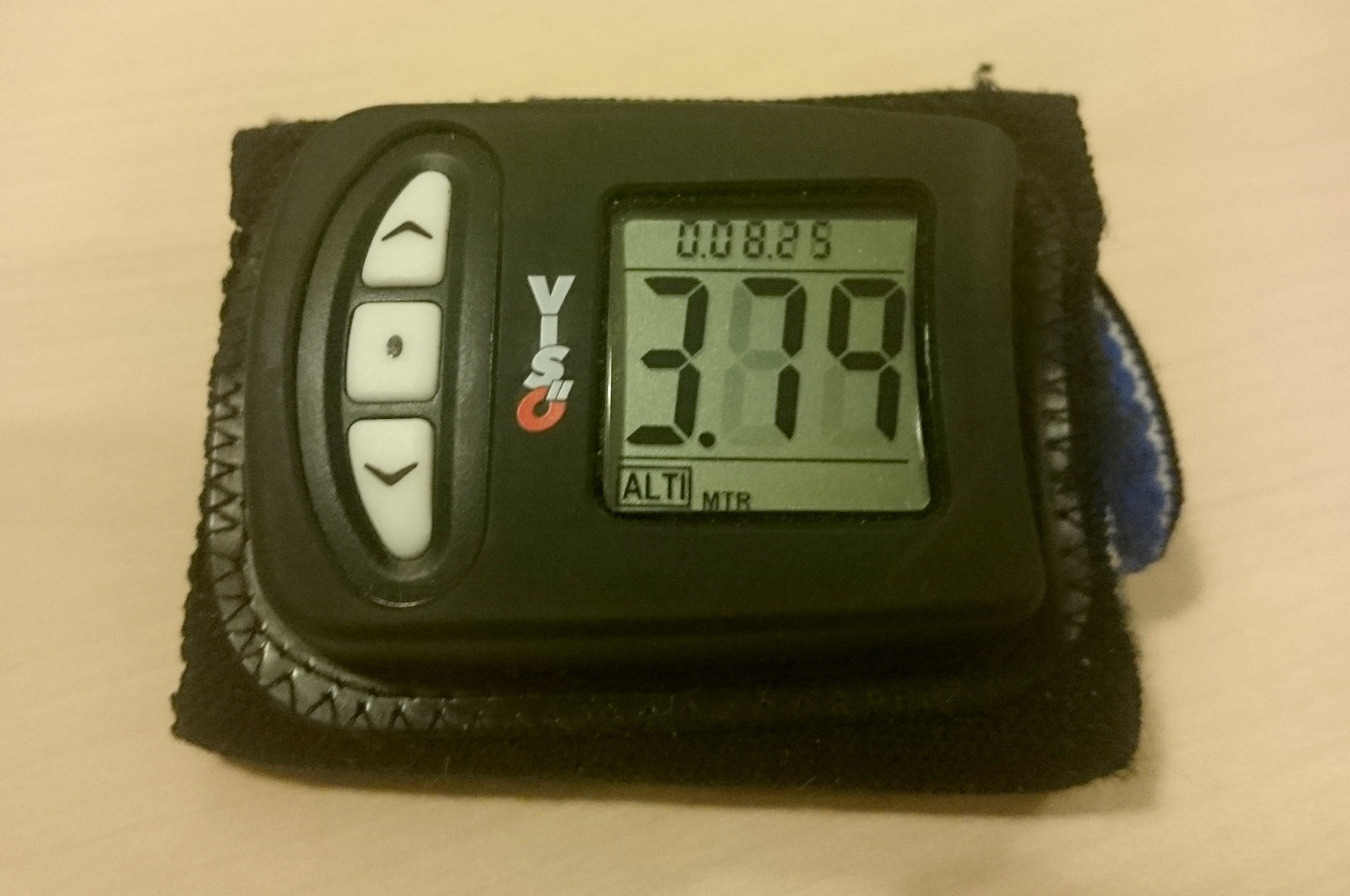
Digital wrist-mounted skydiving altimeter in logbook mode, displaying the last recorded jump profile

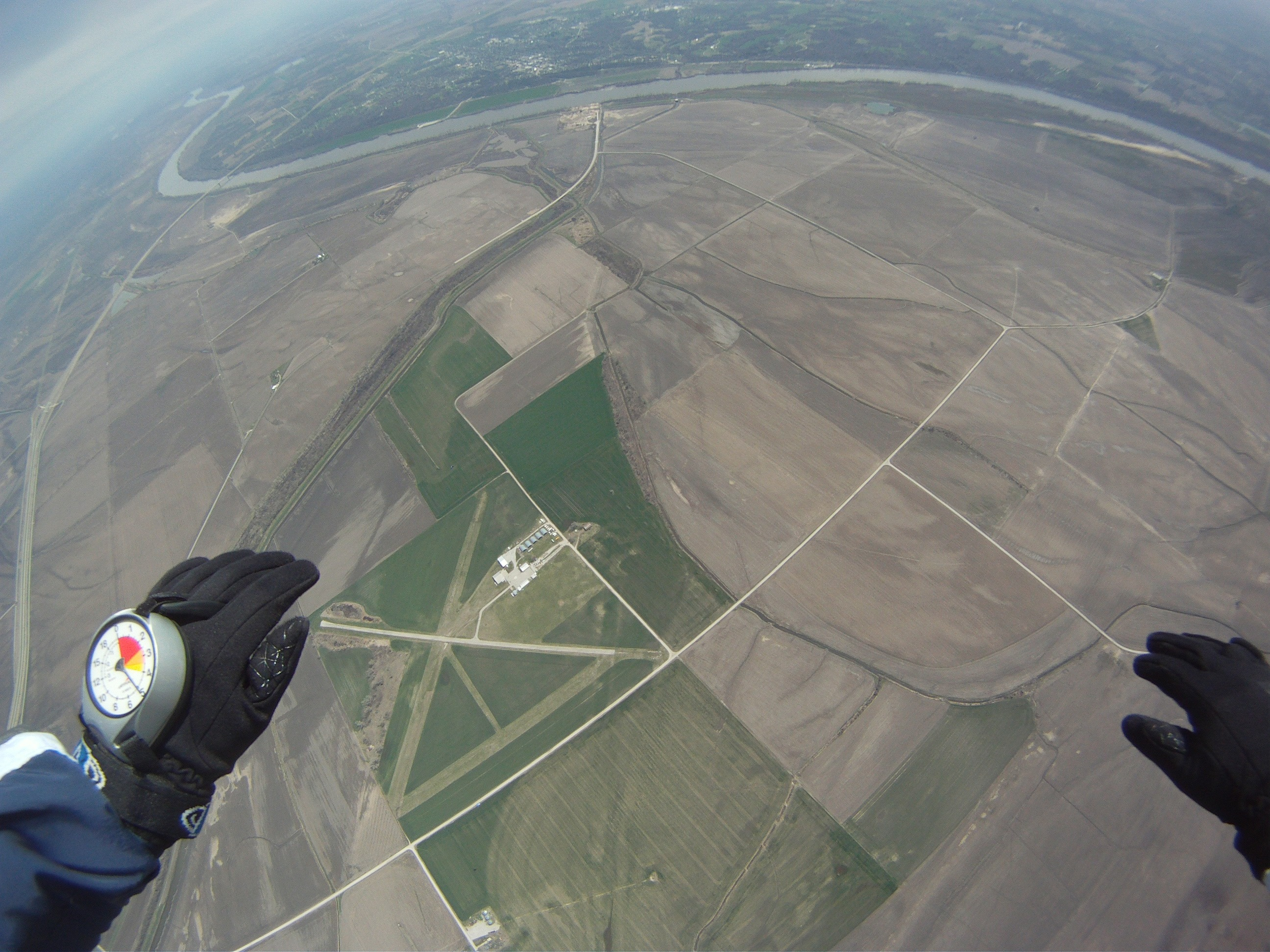
Skydiver in free fall, making use of a hand-mounted altimeter. The analogue face is visible, showing colour-coded decision altitudes. The depicted altimeter is electronic, despite using an analogue display.

An altimeter is the most important piece of skydiving equipment, after the parachute itself. Altitude awareness is crucial at all times during the jump, and determines the appropriate response to maintain safety.

Since altitude awareness is so important in skydiving, there is a wide variety of altimeter designs made specifically for use in the sport, and a non-student skydiver will typically use two or more altimeters in a single jump:

- Hand, wrist or chest-mounted mechanical analogue visual altimeters are the most basic and common devices, and are used by (and commonly mandated for) virtually all student skydivers. The common design has a face marked from 0 to 4000 m (or 0 to 12000 ft, mimicking the clock face), with an arrow pointing to the current altitude. The face plate has sections prominently marked with yellow and red, signifying the recommended deployment altitude and the emergency procedure decision altitude (commonly known as "hard deck") respectively. A mechanical altimeter has a knob that needs to be manually adjusted to make it point to 0 on the ground before jump, and if the landing spot is not at the same altitude as the takeoff spot, the user needs to adjust it appropriately. Some advanced electronic altimeters are also available which make use of the familiar analogue display, despite internally operating digitally.
- Digital visual altimeters are mounted on the wrist or hand. This type always operates electronically, and conveys the altitude as a number, rather than a pointer on a dial. Since these altimeters already contain all the electronic circuitry necessary for altitude calculation, they are commonly equipped with auxiliary functions such as electronic logbook, real-time jump profile replay, speed indication, simulator mode for use in ground training, etc. An electronic altimeter is activated on the ground before the jump, and calibrates automatically to point to 0. It is thus essential that the user not turn it on earlier than necessary to avoid, for example, the drive to a dropzone located at a different altitude than one's home which could cause a potentially fatal false reading. If the intended landing zone is at a different elevation than the takeoff point, the user needs to input the appropriate offset by using a designated function.
- Audible altimeters (also known as "dytters", a genericised trademark of the first such product on the market) are inserted into one's helmet, and emit a warning tone at a predefined altitude. Contemporary audibles have evolved significantly from their crude beginnings, and sport a vast array of functions, such as multiple tones at different altitudes, multiple saved profiles that can be switched quickly, electronic logbook with data transfer to a PC for later analysis, distinct free fall and canopy modes with different warning altitudes, swoop approach guiding tones, etc. Audibles are strictly auxiliary devices, and do not replace, but complement a visual altimeter which remains the primary tool for maintaining altitude awareness. The advent of modern skydiving disciplines such as freeflying, in which the ground might not be in one's field of view for long periods of time, has made the use of audibles nearly universal, and virtually all skydiving helmets come with one or more built-in ports in which an audible might be placed. Audibles are not recommended and often banned from use by student skydivers, who need to build up a proper altitude awareness regime for themselves.
- Auxiliary visual altimeters do not show the precise altitude, but rather help maintain a general indicator in one's peripheral vision. They might either operate in tandem with an audible equipped with an appropriate port, in which case they emit warning flashes complementing the audible tones, or be standalone and use another display mode, such as showing either green or red light depending on the altitude.

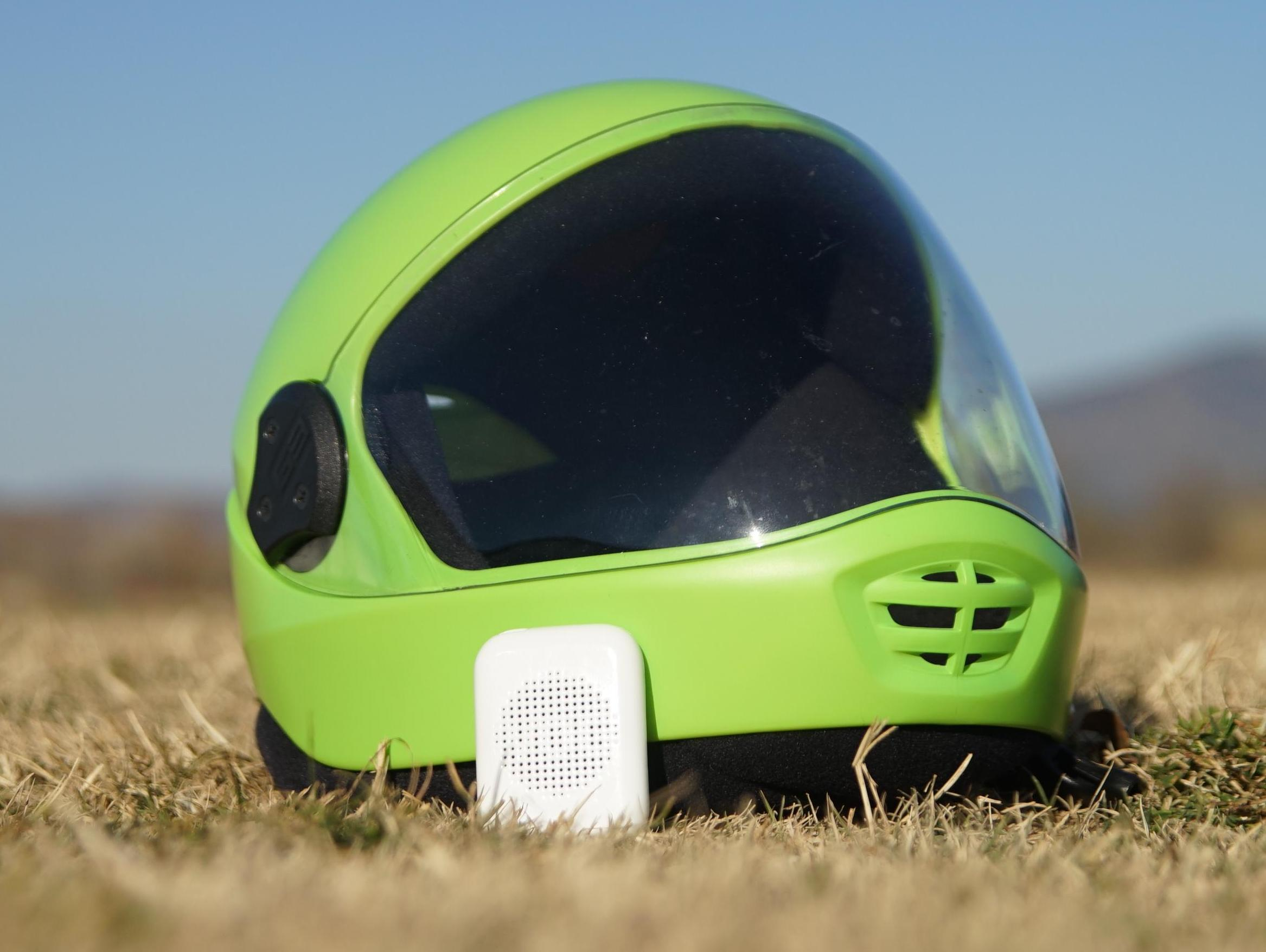
Speaking altimeter with helmet for skydiving

- Speaking altimeters (also known as voice altimeters) combine both audible and visual altimeter functions. Units of this type operate at all altitudes experienced in skydiving, and announce their altitude as a number in the diver's native language. These are inserted into helmet like audible altimeters, and have automatic volume adjustment dependent on the skydiver's speed. The main goal of this type of altimeter is to ensure that skydivers always know their position; this feature is useful for experienced skydivers as well as formation skydiving load organizers or accelerated freefall instructors.

The exact choice of altimeters depends heavily on the individual skydiver's preferences, experience level, primary disciplines, as well as the type of the jump. On one end of the spectrum, a low-altitude demonstration jump with water landing and no free fall might waive the mandated use of altimeters and use none at all. In contrast, a jumper doing freeflying jumps and flying a high performance canopy might use a mechanical analogue altimeter for easy reference in free fall, an in-helmet audible for breakaway altitude warning, additionally programmed with swoop guide tones for canopy flying, as well as a digital altimeter on an armband for quickly glancing the precise altitude on approach. Another skydiver doing similar types of jumps might wear a digital altimeter for their primary visual one, preferring the direct altitude readout of a numeric display.

=== Use in aircraft ===
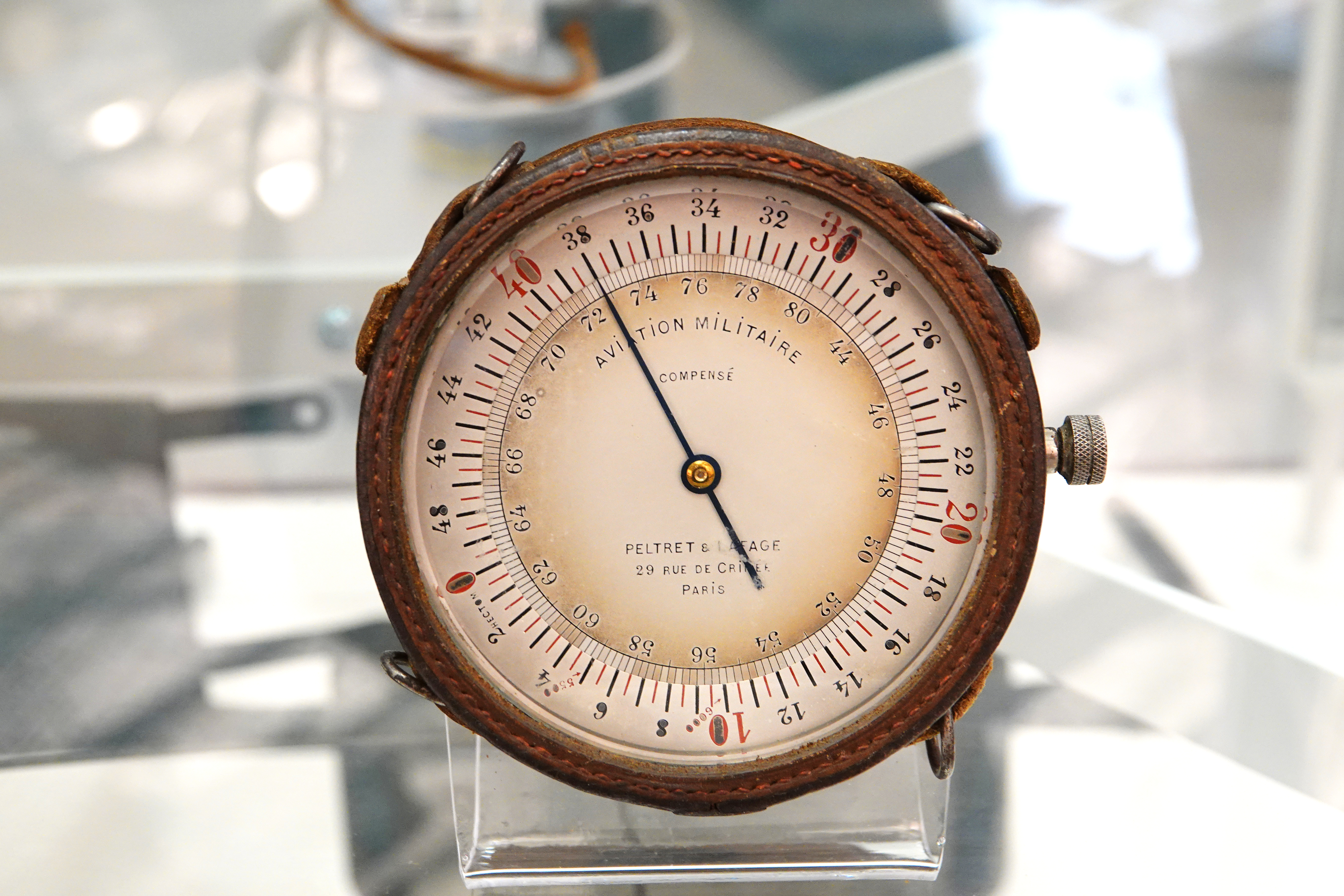
An old altimeter intended for use in aircraft

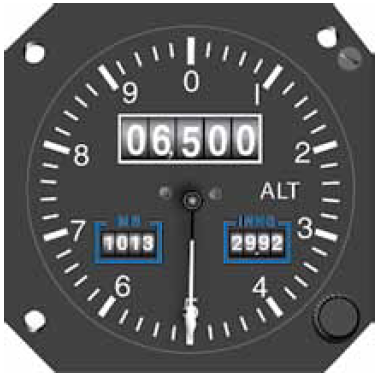
A drum-type aircraft altimeter, showing the small Kollsman windows at the bottom left (hectopascals) and bottom right (inches of mercury) of the face

In aircraft, an aneroid altimeter or aneroid barometer measures the atmospheric pressure from a static port outside the aircraft. Air pressure decreases with an increase of altitude—approximately 100 hectopascals per 800 meters or one inch of mercury per 1000 feet or 1 hectopascals per 30 feet near sea level.

The aneroid altimeter is calibrated to show the pressure directly as an altitude above mean sea level, in accordance with a mathematical model atmosphere defined by the International Standard Atmosphere (ISA). Older aircraft used a simple aneroid barometer where the needle made less than one revolution around the face from zero to full scale. This design evolved to three-pointer altimeters with a primary needle and one or more secondary needles that show the number of revolutions, similar to a clock face. In other words, each needle points to a different digit of the current altitude measurement. However, this design has fallen out of favor due to the risk of misreading in stressful situations. The design evolved further to drum-type altimeters, the final step in analogue instrumentation, where each revolution of a single needle accounted for 1,000 feet (300 metres), with thousand foot increments recorded on a numerical odometer-type drum. To determine altitude, a pilot had first to read the drum to determine the thousands of feet, then look at the needle for the hundreds of feet. Modern analogue altimeters in transport aircraft are typically drum-type. The latest development in clarity is an electronic flight instrument system with integrated digital altimeter displays. This technology has trickled down from airliners and military planes until it is now standard in many general aviation aircraft.

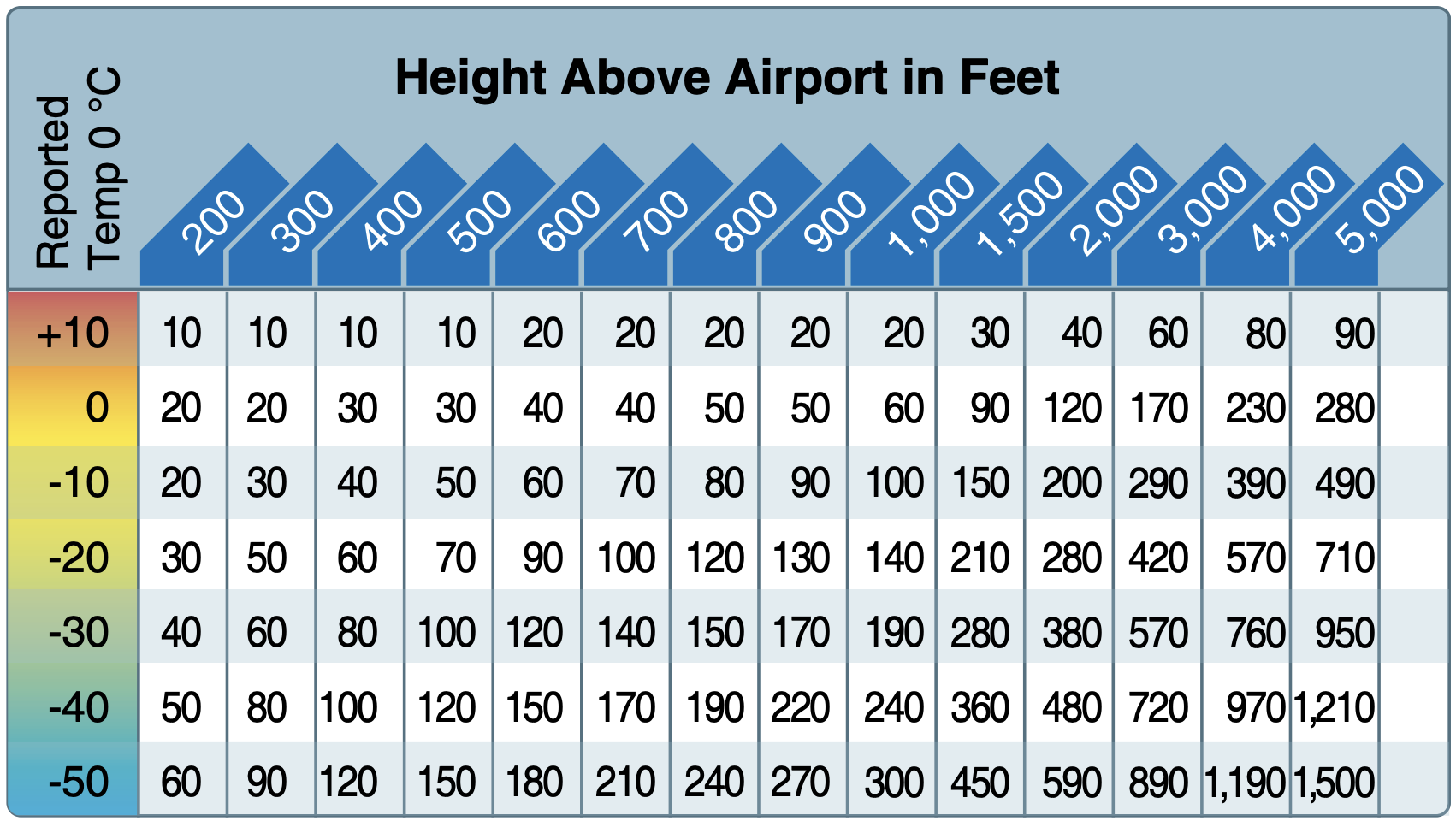
A chart showing how much the true altitude of an aircraft is below the altimeter reading ("indicated altitude") without correcting for temperature. The colder the ambient temperature, the lower the plane is — thus the saying "from hot to cold, look out below".

Modern aircraft use a "sensitive altimeter". On a sensitive altimeter, the sea-level reference pressure can be adjusted with a setting knob. The reference pressure, in inches of mercury in Canada and the United States, and hectopascals (previously millibars) elsewhere, is displayed in the small Kollsman window, on the face of the aircraft altimeter. This is necessary, since sea level reference atmospheric pressure at a given location varies over time with temperature and the movement of pressure systems in the atmosphere.

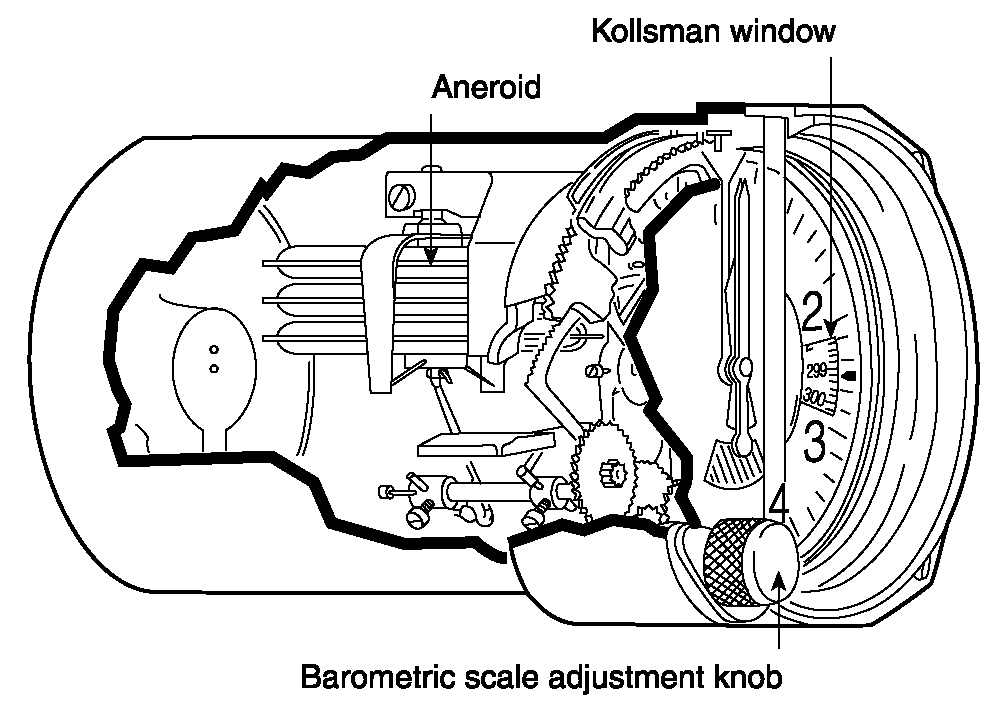
Diagram showing the internal components of the sensitive aircraft altimeter

In aviation terminology, the regional or local air pressure at mean sea level (MSL) is called the QNH or "altimeter setting", and the pressure that will calibrate the altimeter to show the height above ground at a given airfield is called the QFE of the field. An altimeter cannot, however, be adjusted for variations in air temperature. Differences in temperature from the ISA model will accordingly cause errors in indicated altitude.

In aerospace, the mechanical stand-alone altimeters which are based on diaphragm bellows were replaced by integrated measurement systems which are called air data computers (ADC). This module measures altitude, speed of flight and outside temperature to provide more precise output data allowing automatic flight control and flight level division. Multiple altimeters can be used to design a pressure reference system to provide information about the airplane's position angles to further support inertial navigation system calculations.

Pilots can perform preflight altimeter checks by setting the barometric scale to the current reported altimeter setting. The altimeter pointers should indicate the surveyed field elevation of the airport. Federal Aviation Administration requires that if the indication is off by more than 75 ft (23 m) from the surveyed field elevation, the instrument should be recalibrated.

=== Other modes of transport ===
The altimeter is an instrument optional in off-road vehicles to aid in navigation. Some high-performance luxury cars that were never intended to leave paved roads, such as the Duesenberg in the 1930s, have also been equipped with altimeters.
