= Flight level =

Measure in aviation

In aviation, a flight level (FL) is an aircraft's altitude as determined by a pressure altimeter using the International Standard Atmosphere. A flight level is a surface of constant atmospheric pressure used to define an aircraft’s vertical position relative to other aircraft when flying above the transition altitude. It is expressed in hundreds of feet or metres. The altimeter setting used is the ISA sea level pressure of 1013 hPa, or 29.92 inHg. The actual surface pressure will vary from this at different locations and times. Therefore, by using a standard pressure setting, every aircraft has the same altimeter setting, and vertical clearance can be maintained during cruise flight.

Scale comparison of some flight level systems

== Background ==
Flight levels are used to ensure safe vertical separation between aircraft. Historically, altitude has been measured using a pressure altimeter, essentially a calibrated barometer. An altimeter measures ambient air pressure, which decreases with increasing altitude following the barometric formula. It displays the corresponding altitude. If aircraft altimeters were not calibrated consistently, then two aircraft could be flying at the same altitude even though their altimeters appeared to show that they are at different altitudes. Flight levels require defining altitudes based on a standard altimeter setting. All aircraft operating at flight levels set their pressure altimeters to assume a sea-level pressure of 1013 hPa, or 29.92 inHg. On the descent, when descending through the published transition level, the altimeter is set to the local surface pressure to display the literal altitude above sea level.

== Definition ==
A flight level (FL) is described by a number indicating the nominal pressure altitude in hundreds of feet. Therefore, a nominal pressure altitude of 32,000 feet is referred to as "flight level 320". In metre altitudes the format is "xx,000 metres".

Flight levels are usually designated in writing as FLxxx, where xxx is a two- or three-digit number indicating the pressure altitude in units of 100 feet. In radio communications, FL290 would be stated as "flight level two nine(r) zero", indicating a nominal altitude of 29,000 feet.

== Transition altitude ==
While use of a standardised pressure setting facilitates separation of aircraft from each other, it does not provide the aircraft's actual altitude above sea level. Below the transition level (which varies worldwide), the altimeter is set to the local altimeter setting, which can be directly compared to the known elevation of the terrain. The pressure setting to achieve this varies with local atmospheric pressure. This altimeter setting is referred to by the Q code QNH (barometric pressure adjusted to sea level). The current local QNH value is available from various sources, including air traffic control and the local airport weather frequency or a METAR-issuing station.

The transition altitude (TA) is the altitude above sea level at which ascending aircraft change from the use of local pressure to the use of standard pressure. When operating at or below the TA, aircraft altimeters are usually set to show the altitude above sea level. Above the TA, the aircraft altimeter pressure setting is changed to the standard pressure setting of 1013 hectopascals (equivalent to millibars) or 29.92 inches of mercury, with the aircraft altitude stated as a flight level (FL) instead of altitude.

In the United States and the southern domestic airspace of Canada, the transition altitude is 18,000 ft (5,500 m). In most other countries, the transition altitude varies and can be as low as 3,000 ft (900 m). There are discussions to standardize the transition altitude within the Eurocontrol area. In the United Kingdom, different airports have different transition altitudes, between 3000 and 6000 feet.

On 25 November 2004 the Civil Aviation Authority of New Zealand raised New Zealand's transition altitude from 11,000 to 13,000 feet (3,400 to 4,000 m) and changed the transition level from FL130 to FL150.

The transition level (TL) is the lowest flight level above the transition altitude. The table below shows the transition level according to transition altitude and QNH. When descending below the transition level, the pilot starts to refer to altitude of the aircraft by setting the altimeter to the QNH for the region or airfield.

Table for determining transition level (TL)
Aerodrome QNH in hectopascals	Transition altitude (TA) in feet			
Aerodrome QNH in hectopascals	3,000 ft (900 m)	4,000 ft (1200 m)	5,000 ft (1500 m)	6,000 ft (1850 m)
1050–1060	FL030	FL040	FL050	FL060
1032–1049	FL035	FL045	FL055	FL065
1014–1031	FL040	FL050	FL060	FL070
995–1013	FL045	FL055	FL065	FL075
977–994	FL050	FL060	FL070	FL080
959–976	FL055	FL065	FL075	FL085
940–958	FL060	FL070	FL080	FL090

The transition layer is the airspace between the transition altitude and the transition level.

According to these definitions the transition layer is 0–500 feet (0–150 m) thick. Aircraft are not normally assigned to fly at the transition level as this would provide inadequate separation from traffic flying on QNH at the transition altitude. Instead, the lowest usable flight level is the transition level plus 500 ft.

However, in some countries, such as Norway and the United Kingdom for example, the transition level is determined by adding a buffer of minimum 1,000 ft (300 m) (depending on QNH) to the transition altitude. Therefore, aircraft may be flying at both transition level and transition altitude, and still be vertically separated by at least 1,000 ft (300 m). In those areas the transition layer will be 1,000–1,500 ft (300–460 m) thick, depending on QNH.

In summary, the connection between transition altitude (TA), transition layer (TLYR), and transition level (TL) is

TL = TA + TLYR

== Semicircular/hemispheric rule ==
The semicircular rule (also known as the hemispheric rule) applies, in slightly different version, to IFR flights in the UK inside controlled airspace and generally in the rest of the world. The standard rule defines an East/West track split:

- Eastbound – Magnetic track 000 to 179° – odd thousands (FL 250, 270, etc.)
- Westbound – Magnetic track 180 to 359° – even thousands (FL 260, 280, etc.)

At FL 290 and above, if reduced vertical separation minima (RVSM) are not in use, 4,000 ft intervals are used to separate same-direction aircraft (instead of 2,000 ft intervals below FL 290), and only odd flight levels are assigned, independent of the direction of flight:

- Eastbound – Magnetic track 000 to 179° – odd flight levels (FL 290, 330, 370, etc.)
- Westbound – Magnetic track 180 to 359° – even flight levels (FL 310, 350, 390, etc.)

Conversely, RVSM equipped aircraft are able to continue separation in 2,000 ft intervals as outlined in the semicircular rules. Both non-RVSM and RVSM equipped aircraft use a separation of 4,000 ft above FL 410.

Countries where the major airways are oriented north/south (e.g., New Zealand; Italy; Portugal) have semicircular rules that define a North/South rather than an East/West track split.

In Italy, France, Portugal and recently also in Spain (AIP ENR 1.7-3), for example, southbound traffic uses odd flight levels; in New Zealand, southbound traffic uses even flight levels. In Europe commonly used International Civil Aviation Organization (ICAO) separation levels are as per the following table:

Vertical separation of VFR and IFR flights
Magnetic route figure of merit (FOM)
0° to 179°				180° to 359°			
IFR		VFR		IFR		VFR	
FL	feet	FL	feet	FL	feet	FL	feet
010	1,000	—N/a	—N/a	020	2,000	—N/a	—N/a
030	3,000	035	3,500	040	4,000	045	4,500
050	5,000	055	5,500	060	6,000	065	6,500
070	7,000	075	7,500	080	8,000	085	8,500
090	9,000	095	9,500	100	10,000	105	10,500
110	11,000	115	11,500	120	12,000	125	12,500
130	13,000	135	13,500	140	14,000	145	14,500
150	15,000	155	15,500	160	16,000	165	16,500
170	17,000	175	17,500	180	18,000	185	18,500
190	19,000	195	19,500	200	20,000	—N/a	—N/a
210	21,000	—N/a	—N/a	220	22,000	—N/a	—N/a
230	23,000	—N/a	—N/a	240	24,000	—N/a	—N/a
250	25,000	—N/a	—N/a	260	26,000	—N/a	—N/a
270	27,000	—N/a	—N/a	280	28,000	—N/a	—N/a
290	29,000	—N/a	—N/a	310	31,000	—N/a	—N/a
330	33,000	—N/a	—N/a	350	35,000	—N/a	—N/a
370	37,000	—N/a	—N/a	390	39,000	—N/a	—N/a
410	41,000	—N/a	—N/a	430	43,000	—N/a	—N/a
450	45,000	—N/a	—N/a	470	47,000	—N/a	—N/a
490	49,000	—N/a	—N/a	510	51,000	—N/a	—N/a

== Quadrantal rule ==
The quadrantal rule is defunct. It was used in the United Kingdom but was abolished in 2015 to bring the UK in line with the semi-circular rule used around the world.

The quadrantal rule applied to IFR flights in the UK both in and outside of controlled airspace except that such aircraft may be flown at a level other than required by this rule if flying in conformity with instructions given by an air traffic control unit, or if complying with notified en-route holding patterns or holding procedures notified in relation to an aerodrome. The rule affected only those aircraft operating under IFR when in level flight above 3,000 ft above mean sea level, or above the appropriate transition altitude, whichever is the higher, and when below FL195 (19,500 ft above the 1013.2 hPa datum in the UK, or with the altimeter set according to the system published by the competent authority in relation to the area over which the aircraft is flying if such aircraft is not flying over the UK.)

The rule was non-binding upon flights operating under visual flight rules (VFR).

Minimum vertical separation between two flights abiding by the UK Quadrantal Rule is 500 ft (note these are in geopotential foot units). The level to be flown is determined by the magnetic track of the aircraft, as follows:

- Magnetic track 000 to, and including, 089° – odd thousands of feet (FL070, 090, 110 etc.)
- Magnetic track 090 to, and including, 179° – odd thousands plus 500 ft (FL075, 095, 115 etc.)
- Magnetic track 180 to, and including, 269° – even thousands of feet (FL080, 100, 120 etc.)
- Magnetic track 270 to, and including, 359° – even thousands plus 500 ft (FL085, 105, 125 etc.)

== Reduced vertical separation minima (RVSM) ==
Reduced vertical separation minima (RVSM) reduces the vertical separation between FL290 and FL410. This allows aircraft to safely fly more optimum routes, save fuel and increase airspace capacity by adding new flight levels. Only aircraft that have been certified to meet RVSM standards, with several exclusions, are allowed to fly in RVSM airspace. It was introduced into the UK in March 2001. On 20 January 2002, it entered European airspace. The United States, Canada and Mexico transitioned to RVSM between FL 290 and FL 410 on 20 January 2005, and Africa on 25 September 2008.

- Track 000 to 179° – odd thousands (FL 290, 310, 330, etc.)
- Track 180 to 359° – even thousands (FL 300, 320, 340, etc.)

At FL 410 and above, 4,000 ft intervals are resumed to separate same-direction aircraft and only odd Flight Levels are assigned, depending on the direction of flight:

- Track 000 to 179° – odd flight levels (FL 410, 450, 490, etc.)
- Track 180 to 359° – even flight levels (FL 430, 470, 510, etc.)

== Metre flight levels ==
The International Civil Aviation Organization (ICAO) has recommended a transition to using the International System of Units since 1979 with a recommendation on using metres (m) for reporting flight levels. China, Mongolia, Russia and many CIS countries have used flight levels specified in metres for years. Aircraft entering these areas normally make a slight climb or descent to adjust for this, although Russia and some CIS countries started using feet above transition altitude and introduced RVSM at the same time on 17 November 2011.

=== Kyrgyzstan, Kazakhstan, Tajikistan, Uzbekistan, and Turkmenistan ===
The flight levels below apply to Kyrgyzstan, Kazakhstan, Tajikistan and Uzbekistan and for 6,000 metres or lower in Turkmenistan, where feet are used above 6,000 m (19,700 ft). Flight levels are read as e.g. "flight level 7,500 metres":

Track 180° to 359°		Track 0° to 179°	
metres	feet	metres	feet
600	2,000	900	3,000
1,200	3,900	1,500	4,900
1,800	5,900	2,100	6,900
2,400	7,900	2,700	8,900
3,000	9,800	3,300	10,800
3,600	11,800	3,900	12,800
4,200	13,800	4,500	14,800
4,800	15,700	5,100	16,700
5,400	17,700	5,700	18,700
6,000	19,700	6,300	20,700
6,600	21,700	6,900	22,600
7,200	23,600	7,500	24,600
7,800	25,600	8,100	26,600
8,600	28,200	9,100	29,900
9,600	31,500	10,100	33,100
10,600	34,800	11,100	36,400
11,600	38,100	12,100	39,700
13,100	43,000	14,100	46,300
15,100	49,500	16,100	52,800
each 2,000 m after		each 2,000 m after	

=== People's Republic of China and Mongolia ===
The flight levels below apply to Mongolia and People's Republic of China, not including Hong Kong. To distinguish from flight levels in feet, flight levels are read without "flight level", e.g. "one two thousand six hundred metres" or for 12,600 m (Chinese only available in Chinese airspace). To distinguish altitude from flight level, "on standard" or "on QNH" would be added during initial clearance, such as "climb 4,800 metres on standard" or "descent 2,400 metres on QNH 1020".

RVSM was implemented in China at 16:00 UTC on 21 November 2007, and in Mongolia at 00:01 UTC on 17 November 2011. China's Flight Level Allocation Scheme implements RSVM between 8,900 m and 12,500 m using tweaked conversions to feet to maintain the 1,000 ft minimum standard. Pilots are advised to maintain the flight level indicated in feet (i.e. xx,100 ft) while communicating the corresponding level in metres. Aircraft flying in feet according to the table below will have differences between the metric readout of the onboard avionics and ATC cleared flight level; however, the differences will never be more than thirty metres (98 feet).

Track 180° to 359°		Track 0° to 179°	
metres	feet	metres	feet
600	2,000	900	3,000
1,200	3,900	1,500	4,900
1,800	5,900	2,100	6,900
2,400	7,900	2,700	8,900
3,000	9,800	3,300	10,800
3,600	11,800	3,900	12,800
4,200	13,800	4,500	14,800
4,800	15,700	5,100	16,700
5,400	17,700	5,700	18,700
6,000	19,700	6,300	20,700
6,600	21,700	6,900	22,600
7,200	23,600	7,500	24,600
7,800	25,600	8,100	26,600
8,400	27,600	8,900	29,100
9,200	30,100	9,500	31,100
9,800	32,100	10,100	33,100
10,400	34,100	10,700	35,100
11,000	36,100	11,300	37,100
11,600	38,100	11,900	39,100
12,200	40,100	12,500	41,100
13,100	43,000	13,700	44,900
14,300	46,900	14,900	48,900
each 1,200 m after		each 1,200 m after	

== Flight levels in Russian Federation and North Korea ==
On 5 September 2011 the government of the Russian Federation issued decree No.743, pertaining to the changes in the rules of use of the country's airspace. The new rules came into force on 17 November 2011, introducing a flight level system similar to the one used in the West. RVSM has also been in force since this date.

The following table is true for IFR flights:

Track 0° to 179°			Track 180° to 359°		
FL	metres	feet	FL	metres	feet
10	300	1000	20	600	2000
30	900	3000	40	1200	4000
50	1500	5000	60	1850	6000
70	2150	7000	80	2450	8000
90	2750	9000	100	3050	10000
110	3350	11000	120	3650	12000
130	3950	13000	140	4250	14000
150	4550	15000	160	4900	16000
170	5200	17000	180	5500	18000
190	5800	19000	200	6100	20000
210	6400	21000	220	6700	22000
230	7000	23000	240	7300	24000
250	7600	25000	260	7900	26000
270	8250	27000	280	8550	28000
290	8850	29000	300	9150	30000
310	9450	31000	320	9750	32000
330	10050	33000	340	10350	34000
350	10650	35000	360	10950	36000
370	11300	37000	380	11600	38000
390	11900	39000	400	12200	40000
410	12500	41000	430	13100	43000
450	13700	45000	470	14350	47000
490	14950	49000	510	15550	51000

The new system would eliminate the need to perform climbs and descents in order to enter or leave Russian airspace from or to jurisdictions following the Western standard.

From February 2017, Russia changed to use QNH and feet below the Transition Level. The first airport to use this is ULLI/St. Petersburg. Most other airports still use QFE.

Unlike Russia, North Korea uses metres below the TL based on QNH.

== See also ==
- ICAO recommendations on use of the International System of Units
- Flight planning
- Gillham code
