= QSK operation (full break-in) =

Morse code operating mode

In CW Morse code operations, QSK or full break-in operation describes an operating mode in which the transmitting station can detect signals from other stations between the elements (dots and dashes) or letters of the Morse transmission. This allows other stations to interrupt the transmitting station between individual coding elements, and such allows for a conversational style of communication.

"QSK" is one of the Q-code signals established for radiotelegraph operators in the first decade of the 1900s. The three letter code "QSK" literally means "I can hear you between my signals; you may break in on my transmission." Although Morse code is no longer used for commercial or professional purposes, it continues to be used in amateur radio.

In QSK or full break-in operation the silent periods between the Morse code dits and dahs enable operators to listen between their transmitted signals for signals from the other operator, thus enabling a conversational style of communication. This is especially useful in high-speed telegraphy.

== Signals, silent periods and symbols ==
Morse code has silent periods between its symbol elements (dots and dashes), letters, words, and sentences. These silent periods provide the sending operator with opportunities to listen for interruptions from receiving stations. Whereas in usual CW operation the sending carrier wave is always on, and only gated to the antenna, in QSK operation the antenna is switched to receiver status on the off-time between dits and dahs, and then switched right back.

This fast switching between sending and receiving on the transceiver sending the current message segment lets the sending side of the conversation hear that the receiving side has switched to transmitting, in between the off-times of Morse code. The intermixed signal is normally too garbled for either station to decode the other. (Note: It is conceivable that the interrupting signal might be decoded by the sender, if the sender's transceiver produces noticeably different pitches for the sent and received signals, possibly also with the help of software or a waterfall spectrum display. But even without either station being able to make out the other's message in the combined signal, QSK operation always allows both operators to know that the former listener now wants to send.) But when the QSK sender does hear the other station's sound filling in the normally silent gaps between the sender's own sent code elements, that informs the sender that the other station wants to break in, and the sender then has the option to politely stop and let the other operator back into the conversation early, before the sender has finished his / her current message segment.

== QSK transmit/receive (T/R) switch operation ==
QSK operation is a technical challenge: It requires very fast T/R RF switches at the high power and voltage side of the radio transceiver. Such switches must be controlled automatically by the telegraph key, and as such they must be rapid enough to be perceptually undetectable by the telegraph operator. In QSK operation, the T/R switches must be capable of automatically and rapidly switching the radio antenna or antennas between the transmitter and receiver during the short (dot duration) silent periods between Morse code signals, sometimes hundreds or even thousands of times per minute, for years on end. As such, the T/R switches used in QSK operation generally have the most stringent timing, reliability, and power handling specifications of all, and are quite expensive. Typically switching of this kind is taken on by vacuum reed switches, maybe aided by high voltage PIN diodes, and sometimes augmented by various circuit improvements that passively take the load off the active elements.

=== Full break-in or QSK operation ===
Full break-in or QSK operation, is a hardware supported Morse code communications channel turn over communications protocol. So, full break-in is also a duplexing protocol, which facilitates a style of two-way Morse code communications on traditional half-duplex radiotelegraph channels that closely simulates full-duplex channel operations similar to the way normal human voice communications proceeds. It is not just a technology, but also a communications protocol and culture revolving around said technology.

With full break-in operation, the receiving operator can interrupt a sending operator in mid-character, similar to the way in which normal human voice conversations allow mid-syllable interruption of speakers by listeners. This makes it possible to creatively break the normal Morse or other radiotelegraphy protocols, and as such, in QSK-operation, many informal idioms appear which are not in use in more codified forms of telegraphy.

For instance, to take turn in conversation, a held note of indefinite length and often varying by discussion/discussee, can be used. This is only possible because the other participant can hear a held note between his keying his own tone. Or as another break from convention, not only do high speed telegraphers often sign off with two non-spaced dits. Many of those whom go with HST and QSK sign off with rather elaborate combinations of dits, dahs, bad spacing, and a "click" here and there. As such, QSK, in its communicational style, also leads to lots of conversational style, which cannot be codified for real.

=== Semi break-in operation ===
Semi break-in is a technique used by stations where slow (T/R) antenna switches are controlled indirectly by the telegraph key which lack the faster switching of full break-in stations. Semi break-in hardware T/R switches are not required to switch as fast or to have the same long term reliability as their more expensive full break-in counterparts. Instead of using the telegraph key to directly control antenna switching, semi break-in radio transceiver equipment typically uses the telegraph key to control T/R switches indirectly, but still automatically, by passing the telegraph key information (usually in the form of a keyed audio tone) through a radio transceiver's Voice-operated switch or VOX circuitry.

In this technique, the relatively slow acting VOX circuitry is used to control the T/R switches. Voice-operated switch (VOX) circuitry is designed to be normally activated by human voice audio picked up by the transceiver microphone during voice communications in order to effect antenna change over at a rate no faster than the typical human voice syllabic rate or slower. VOX circuitry usually has a front panel adjustable delay that can be used to control the length of time it takes for T/R switches to operate but generally the delay adjustment range is limited to that of human voice syllables and, although automatic, is generally not fast enough to act in the short periods between Morse code dots and dashes. Receiving stations thus cannot break-in or interrupt semi break-in or VOX controlled Morse code stations in mid-symbol or mid-word, during Morse code operation because the semi break-in sending station simply cannot hear in the short duration between the Morse code signals and words or code groups.

Receiving stations wishing to break-in on semi break-in stations must wait for the longer silent periods between the sending station's words or sentences before attempting to interrupt or break-in. At worst, receiving stations must wait until semi break-in stations explicitly turn over the channel to the receiving station by sending a break prosign. Unlike full break-in operation, semi break-in operation is not fast enough to provide a fluid Morse code conversational capability approximating that of normal human voice conversation.

Although not as fluid and efficient as full break-in, semi break-in or VOX controlled break-in is a better Morse code channel turn over technique than pure manual break-in operation as described in the following paragraph.

=== Manual break-in operation ===
Manual break-in is a technique used in a rudimentary Morse code radio station set up where antenna change over (T/R) switches are not controlled by the telegraph key. Instead antenna change over is accomplished manually by mechanical switches separate from the telegraph key on which the operator sends the Morse code. With such a simple manual turn over system there is no possibility of the sending operator listening between signals or symbols and therefore no possibility for the receiving operator to interrupt the sending operator. Instead the receiving operator must wait until a transmitting operator has indicated the end of transmission by means of a turn over prosign and has manually changed the antenna over from transmitter to receiver. Such manual break-in operation leads to a very slow and stilted style of Morse code conversations.

== QSK protocols ==
QSK operation comprises a hardware switch technology and protocol, wherein participating Morse code stations are equipped with very fast analog radio frequency T/R switches connecting the transmitter, receiver, and antenna. This fast analog hardware switching capability enables a receiving station to interrupt or break-in on a transmitting station in mid-symbol (mid-character), a process known as full break-in. The ability to hear between transmitted signals conferred by fast radio frequency hardware switching only requires Morse code operators to make use of simple communications protocols to manage the channel turn over process. The typical QSK protocol technique is quite simple to learn and to master.

=== Opening protocol ===
Since not all Morse code radio stations are equipped for QSK operation, sending stations equipped for QSK operation will often open a Morse conversation by sending the three letter group QSK (e.g. the operator will assert QSK) during an initial (opening) Morse code transmission to alert receiving stations that the sending station has the ability to listen between signals and that the receiving station can interrupt, or break-in, on the sending station at will. Conversely a station may query another Morse code station's QSK capability by sending the QSK signal followed by a question mark. The query QSK? asks if the receiving station has full break-in capability. If a receiving station is equipped for QSK operation the receiving operator will respond to the query QSK? with the assertion QSK indicating that the station is operating with QSK enabled. Subsequently, the two stations can then use the fluid and efficient Morse code conversational QSK protocols outlined in the following paragraphs.

In practice, many skilled operators do not bother to open a conversation with the preliminary opening QSK assertion or QSK query protocols, instead merely attempting to interrupt a sending station by tapping their telegraph key while listening between the signals (dots and dashes) for what happens next. If the sending station pauses when interrupted each party automatically knows the other is using QSK operation and then the two stations immediately start using the following QSK interrupt and turn over protocol with no further ado.

=== Interrupt protocol ===
Interruptions or break-ins are initiated by receiving stations momentarily depressing their telegraph key while the sending station is actively sending Morse code, thus generating a short interrupting signal which is heard by the sending station between its own signals. In practice usually only a single dot is required to initiate a break-in.

=== Turn over protocol ===
Upon hearing the break-in signal between the dots and dashes being sent, the interrupted station stops sending immediately and

(a) just pauses momentarily or,
(b) optionally sends the end-of-message prosign e̅c̅ (equiv. Morse "+", ▄ ▄▄▄ ▄ ▄▄▄ ▄ ) to indicate "I'm done",
(c) sends a single letter K prosign ( ▄▄▄ ▄ ▄▄▄ ) meaning "go ahead" and pauses momentarily,

either way turning over the channel to the interrupter, and subsequently listens for the other station during the momentary pause. Skilled telegraphists seldom bother to send the K prosign when interrupted, instead simply letting the interrupter take over the channel during the pause.

=== Ongoing channel control protocol ===
The interrupting station, recognizing the momentary sending pause by the sender, immediately begins sending its own information to the interrupted station. Meanwhile, the interrupting station continues listening between its own transmitted signals in case of interruption in the reverse direction by the original sender.

These simple full break-in channel turn over protocols literally mimic the conversational style in which people interrupt each other mid-syllable during normal voice conversations. Full break-in QSK T/R switch hardware together with use of the simple QSK protocols enables a fast, efficient, fluid conversational style of Morse code communication.

== Signal level range considerations ==
Enormous signal level ranges must be accommodated by radio transceiver equipment. Transmitter output power for amateur radio stations might typically be 100 watts (+50 dBm) or more, while received power at radio receiver antenna input terminals might typically be as low as −130 dBm. This range of signal power that must be handled by various components of the T/R switching hardware encompasses an enormous total power handling range of up to 180 dBm (−130 to 50 dBm). This logarithmic measure of range encompasses a signal power ratio of 1 to 1 followed by 18 zeros (1:1,000,000,000,000,000,000).

Depending upon the Engineering set up, radiotelegraph stations may use either a single antenna for both transmit and receive or, separate transmit and receive antennas. In either case, when receivers are operating on the same or nearby radio frequencies as used by their associated transmitters, while using the same or nearby antennas, the typical radio receiver is thus exposed to extremely large signals from the nearby transmitter. This situation would generally result in the destruction or degradation of the receiver front end circuitry and would be problematic at best and destructive at worst. As of this writing there has yet apparently been no receiver technology developed that can operate with full sensitivity over such a huge range of received signal levels whilst also safely withstanding the high power levels presented by the associated nearby transmitter. And so receiver inputs cannot simply be bridged across transmitting antenna terminals! Receivers must be isolated from the powerful transmitter signals by some means. These means are provided by the so-called T/R switches.

The low level analog front end (AFE) amplifier circuitry of receivers sensitive enough to detect signals at −130 dBm levels and below are invariably extremely sensitive to high power levels. Typically, without the protection and isolation provided by T/R switches, the receiver AFE would be overwhelmed or destroyed by the normal transmitter power levels which are in the +50 dBm or more range. Consequently, receiver AFE antenna input terminals must be protected. With QSK operation this receiver protection is provided by well designed robust analog hardware T/R switches placed between the receiver AFE circuitry and the radio antenna.

The result of extreme receiver AFE sensitivity to high power levels is that, for most practical purposes, signal reception is impossible during periods when the associated transmitter is actually transmitting the dot and dash signals. Consequently, radiotelegraph operators cannot hear interruptions from remote receiving stations during normal signal transmission periods when the full transmitter power is applied to the antenna.

To protect receiver circuitry, radiotelegraph channels on nearby frequencies and antennas must operate in so-called half-duplex mode wherein the stations at either end alternate between transmitting and receiving (because e.g. simultaneous transmit and receive is simply not possible). To support two way conversations on half duplex channels, analog radio frequency hardware antenna switches must be provided at each station location to connect and disconnect the transmitters and receivers from their antennas whenever the channel transmission control is turned over from one station to the other.

The aforementioned considerations are the prime motivations and considerations driving the development of radiotelegraph channel full break-in QSK technologies:

i prevention of receiver desensitization during transmit periods,
ii prevention of damage or destruction of receiver AFE input circuitry during transmit periods,
iii enabling transmitting stations to listen between signals and,
iv providing efficient, fluid and fluent two way communications on half-duplex radiotelegraph channels.

== Receiver AGC recovery time considerations ==
Not all radio receivers are amenable to QSK operation.

Adding fast robust T/R switching externally to a transmitter/receiver combination (transceiver) will not necessarily result in good QSK operation. Adding such fast switching externally to a transceiver may create transients within receiver circuitry that makes signal copy: very noisy at best, and difficult, or impossible at worst.

Apart from the requirement for fast robust T/R switches, the main factor affecting good QSK operation is the ability for the radio receiver to recover its sensitivity quickly whilst operating quietly (without popping noises) during and after the fast transient signals created by the fast T/R switch operation. Many receivers have automatic gain control (AGC) circuits with time constants that take many milliseconds to recover their sensitivity and volume level after a strong transient signal is presented to their antenna input port. Without modifications or AGC circuit re-design such receivers are not suitable for QSK operation. In cases of slow responding AGC circuitry operators may accept the thumping noise and loss of AGC functionality and choose to turn their receiver AGC function off, instead operating their receivers using only manual gain control during QSK operation.

Morse code operators aspiring to the convenience and conversational fluency of Morse code QSK operation who plan to add external QSK T/R switches to their existing or planned radio transceiver setups should ensure that their receiver AGC circuitry has recovery times commensurate with the T/R switching transients to be expected and that the AGC circuits can operate quickly in the sub-millisecond range without creating noisy pops and static at the receiver audio output (speaker or headphones). Of particular note is that many of the modern so-called software defined radio (SDR) transceivers have particularly slow AGC functions because of the latency created by the extensive digital signal processing (A/D conversion, D/A conversion, digital filtering, digital modulation and digital demodulation) used for the SDR implementation. For these reasons, generally most SDR radios will not have the capability to operate QSK at the higher speed Morse code rates.

Expensive high end radio transceiver equipment that has been designed and manufactured with integrated QSK capability will generally meet such fast AGC recovery time requirements. Receiver recovery times may however be a potential issue for QSK operators who plan to add external QSK switching to an existing radio equipment set up.

== Speed, reliability, and power considerations for T/R switches ==
Full break-in hardware capability requires fast, robust, high power, analog, radio frequency (RF) transmit/receive (T/R) switches or RF switches capable of operating in sub-millisecond response times over long periods of continuous operation while handling the high radio frequency power of the transmitter. Some high-end manufactured radio transceiver equipment contains integrated (factory installed) QSK switching hardware while in other cases external QSK switching hardware or commercial switching products may be added to existing non-QSK capable equipment.

=== Switching speeds ===
As an example illustrating switching speeds or timing requirements consider that when sending Morse code at a 20 word per minute rate the typical dot signal duration is a mere 50 milliseconds. To enable good quality QSK operation the switching hardware must switch the radio antenna from receiver to transmitter in much less than one tenth of the dot duration. At 20 word per minute code speed this means that QSK T/R switching times must be in the range of 1 to ½ millisecond or below. Even smaller sub-millisecond times are required with higher speed Morse code transmissions.

=== Long term reliability ===
The dotting rate of Morse code is the reciprocal of the dot duration, e.g. at twenty words per minute based upon the standard word PARIS with a dot duration of 50 milliseconds, the dotting rate is 20 times per second (20 = 1.0 / 0.050). The dotting rate is even faster for higher speed Morse code. For long time reliability QSK T/R switches must be robust enough to open and close at least at a dotting rate of twenty times per second or even higher over thousands of hours of operation.

=== Power handling ===
T/R switches must operate reliably at high dotting rates over many thousands of hours enabling the reception of extremely low level signals between dots and dashes while handling very high radio transmitter power levels of hundreds to thousands of Watts. Such robust high power analog radio frequency high speed switches are not inexpensive.

=== T/R switch technologies ===
Examples of radio frequency analog hardware switch or RF switch technologies are high voltage vacuum relays or high power semiconductor PIN diode switches. In recent times, as PIN diode power handling capabilities have been improved by the semiconductor industry, PIN diodes have largely supplanted vacuum relays in the QSK switch function because the absence of moving parts in PIN diode semiconductor devices results in: higher speeds, higher reliability and longer lifetimes. An alternative approach uses power relays for QSK operation by adding a few milliseconds of delay in the keying line.

Switching hardware technologies that can handle the radio frequency currents of high power transmitters and also switch quietly at these high Morse code rates over long periods of time are difficult to design and quite expensive to manufacture. Mechanical switches or relays are most problematic and least reliable and must be protected from arcs (sparking) usually by operating in a vacuum enclosure with elaborate timing circuitry. Not all radio transceiver equipment provides the costly high speed analog transmit/receive (T/R) radio frequency switching hardware support necessary for QSK full break-in operation. Generally full break-in is available only on more expensive radio transceivers. Radiotelegraphers who aspire to the fluency of Morse code QSK operation must ensure that their radio equipment includes the hardware capability for radio frequency antenna switching that operates rapidly enough to allow listening between signals, at the appropriate Morse code sending speeds, with appropriate lifetimes and reliability.

== See also ==
- Analog front-end (AFE)
- Communications protocol
- dBm
- Duplex (telecommunications)
- Simplex communication
