= Pressure altitude =

Altitude at which atmosphere has a specified pressure

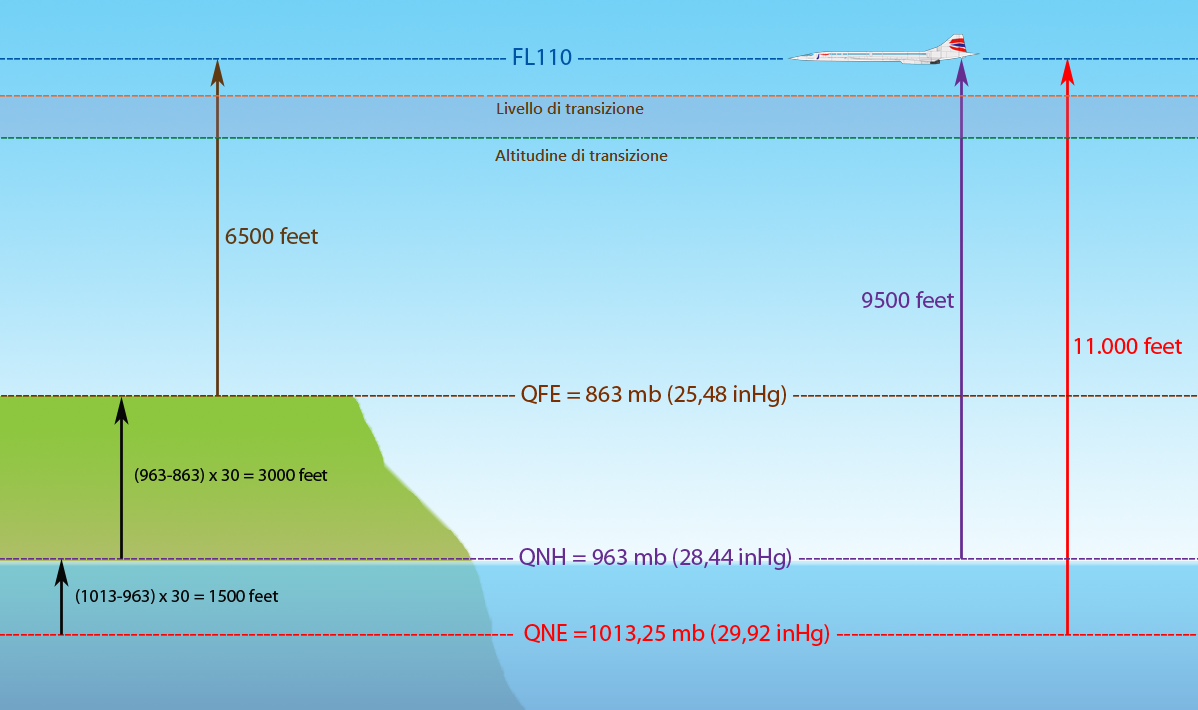

Given an atmospheric pressure measurement, the pressure altitude is the imputed altitude that the International Standard Atmosphere (ISA) model predicts to have the same pressure as the observed value.

The National Oceanic and Atmospheric Administration (NOAA) published the following formula for directly converting atmospheric pressure in millibars (mb) to pressure altitude in feet (ft):

Pressure altitude
Pressure	1013.25 mb
Altitude	0 ft
Altitude	0 m

$$h = 145366.45 \left[ 1 - \left( \frac{\text{Station pressure in millibars}}{1013.25} \right)^{0.190284} \right].$$

In aviation, pressure altitude is the height above a standard datum plane (SDP), which is a theoretical level where the weight of the atmosphere is 29.921 inches of mercury (1,013.2 mbar; 14.696 psi) as measured by a barometer. It indicates altitude obtained when an altimeter is set to an agreed baseline pressure under certain circumstances in which the aircraft’s altimeter would be unable to give a useful altitude readout. Examples would be landing at a high altitude or near sea level under conditions of exceptionally high air pressure. Old altimeters were typically limited to displaying the altitude when set between 950 mb and 1030 mb. Standard pressure, the baseline used universally, is 1013.25 hectopascals (hPa), which is equivalent to 1013.25 mb or 29.92 inches of mercury (inHg). This setting is equivalent to the atmospheric pressure at mean sea level (MSL) in the ISA. Pressure altitude is primarily used in aircraft-performance calculations and in high-altitude flight (i.e., above the transition altitude).

== Inverse equation ==
Solving the equation for the pressure gives
$$p = 1013.25\left(1-\frac{h}{44307.694 \text{ m}}\right)^{5.25530} \text{ hPa}$$
where m are meter and hPa refers to hecto-Pascal.

== Pressure altitude equations ==
Most aviation texts for PPL and CPL exams describe a process for finding the pressure altitude (in feet) using one of the following rule of thumb formulae.

Internationally, pressure altitude is approximated as:

$$\text{Pressure altitude (PA)} = \text{Elevation} + 30 \times (1013 - \text{QNH}).$$

For example, if the airfield elevation is $500 ~ \mathrm{ft}$ and the QNH is $993 ~ \mathrm{mb}$, then

$$\begin{align}
\text{PA} & = 500 + 30 \times (1013 - 993) \\
& = 500 + 30 \times 20 \\
& = 500 + 600 \\
& = 1100.
\end{align}$$

If the altimeter uses inches of mercury, as common in the United States, Canada, and Japan, the following formula is used:

$$\text{Pressure altitude (PA)} = \text{Elevation} + 1000 \times (29.92 - \text{Altimeter setting}).$$

For example, if the airfield elevation is $500 ~ \mathrm{ft}$ and the altimeter setting is $29.32 ~ \mathrm{inHg}$, then

$$\begin{align}
\text{PA} & = 500 + 1000 \times (29.92 - 29.32) \\
& = 500 + 1000 \times 0.6 \\
& = 500 + 600 \\
& = 1100.
\end{align}$$

Aircraft Mode “C” transponders report the pressure altitude to air traffic control; corrections for atmospheric pressure variations are applied by the recipient of the data.

The relationship between static pressure and pressure altitude is defined in terms of properties of the ISA.

== QNE ==
QNE is an aeronautical code Q code. The term refers to the indicated altitude at the landing runway threshold when $1013.25 ~ \mathrm{mb}$ or $29.92 ~ \mathrm{inHg}$ is set in the altimeter's Kollsman window. It is the pressure altitude at the landing runway threshold.

== See also ==
- QNH
- Flight level
- Cabin altitude
- Density altitude
- Standard conditions for temperature and pressure
- Barometric formula
