= QFF =

System of reference atitude-pressure

QFF is an Aeronautical Code Q code. It is the MSL pressure derived from local meteorological station conditions in accordance with meteorological practice. This is the altimeter setting that is intended to produce correct altitude indication (i.e., no error) on an altimeter at the actual sea level elevation, while QNH is intended to have no error at the station elevation (or, especially when applied within a region with a relatively small range of surface elevations, at the altitudes close to the surface elevation within the region).

Meteorological practice of calculating QFF differs between meteorological organizations around the world. Some examples:

- The Australian Bureau of Meteorology method:

QFF is derived from the barometric pressure at the station location by calculating the weight of an imaginary air column, extending from the location to sea level, assuming the temperature and relative humidity at the location are the long term monthly mean, the temperature lapse rate is according to ISA and the relative humidity lapse rate is zero.

QFF is the location value plotted on surface synoptic chart and is closer to reality than QNH, though it is only indirectly used in aviation.

- Another method:

The derivation assumes that an isothermal layer at the station temperature extends to the sea level. This is the barometric pressure at the surface reduced to MSL using the observed temperature at the surface (which assumes an isothermal layer from MSL to that surface). QFF accounts for the effect that temperature has on the pressure lapse rate and therefore the resultant calculated pressure.

The range of QFF so far recorded, low pressure to high pressure, is from 856 to 1083 hPa.

== See also ==
- Atmospheric pressure
- QFE
- QNH
