= Samsung Bio Processor =

The Samsung Bio Processor is an advanced system logic chip designed by Samsung Electronics in December 2015 that integrates five AFEs including bioelectrical impedance analysis (BIA), photoplethysmogram (PPG), electrocardiogram (ECG), skin temperature, and galvanic skin response (GSR) into a single chip that measures body fat, and skeletal muscle mass, heart rate, heart rhythm, skin temperature and stress level. It is designed for future fitness wearable devices. The chip is also designed to be included in "patches" that track health, and the chip design is available for other companies to use. The chip is designed for low power usage to allow it to be used in small devices with small batteries.

== See also ==
- Apple motion coprocessors
