= Index of standards articles =

Articles related to standards include:

== A ==
- Advanced Audio Coding
- Advanced Encryption Standard
- ANSI
- ANSI C standard library
- ASCII
- ASN.1
- avoirdupois

== B ==
- barcode
- BASIC programming language
- British Standards Institution
- Bureau International des Poids et Mesures (BIPM)

== C ==
- CCITT
- CEN
- character encoding
- character set
- Coding standard
- color space
- Common Criteria
- Computer display standard
- Conférence Générale des Poids et Mesures (CGPM)
- configuration management
- country codes

== D ==
- Data Encryption Standard
- de facto standard
- de jure
- Defense Standard
- DIN
- DSSSL
- Charles Benjamin Dudley

== E ==
- EAN
- EBCDIC
- ETSI
- Extended Industry Standard Architecture

== F ==
- Federal Information Processing Standard
- Federal standard
- Federal standard 1037C
- FIPS

== G ==
- G.hn
- Global Trade Item Numbering (GTIN)
- Gold Standard Act

== H ==
- History of Weights and Measures

== I ==
- International Electrotechnical Commission
- IEEE
- IETF
- Imperial units
- Industry Standard Architecture
- Interface standard
- International Financial Reporting Standards
- International standard
- Internet standard
- ISBN
- International Organization for Standardization
- List of ISO standards
- ISO 4217 currency codes
- ISSN
- ITS-90
- ITU-R
- ITU-T
- IUPAC

== J ==
- JIS
- JPEG
- JPEG 2000

== K ==
- Kansas City standard

== L ==
- List of international common standards

== M ==
- Metrology
- MIL-SPEC
- MPEG
- MPEG-1
- MPEG-2
- MPEG-4

== N ==
- National Institute of Standards and Technology
- NIST

== O ==
- open standard
- operational definition

== P ==
- paper size
- Particle physics standard model
- POSIX
- preferred numbers
- project management

== Q ==
Qi (standard)

== R ==
- Rail gauge

== S ==
- SCC
- SGML
- SI
- Swedish Standards Institute
- speed of light
- Standard accounting practice
- Standard data model
- Standard gauge
- Standard Generalized Markup Language (SGML)
- standardization
- system of units

== T ==
- Technical standard

== U ==
- UCS
- Unicode
- UPC
- UTC

== W ==
- W3C
- Weights and measures
- WGS-84
