= Altimeter setting =

Setting for pressure altimeters

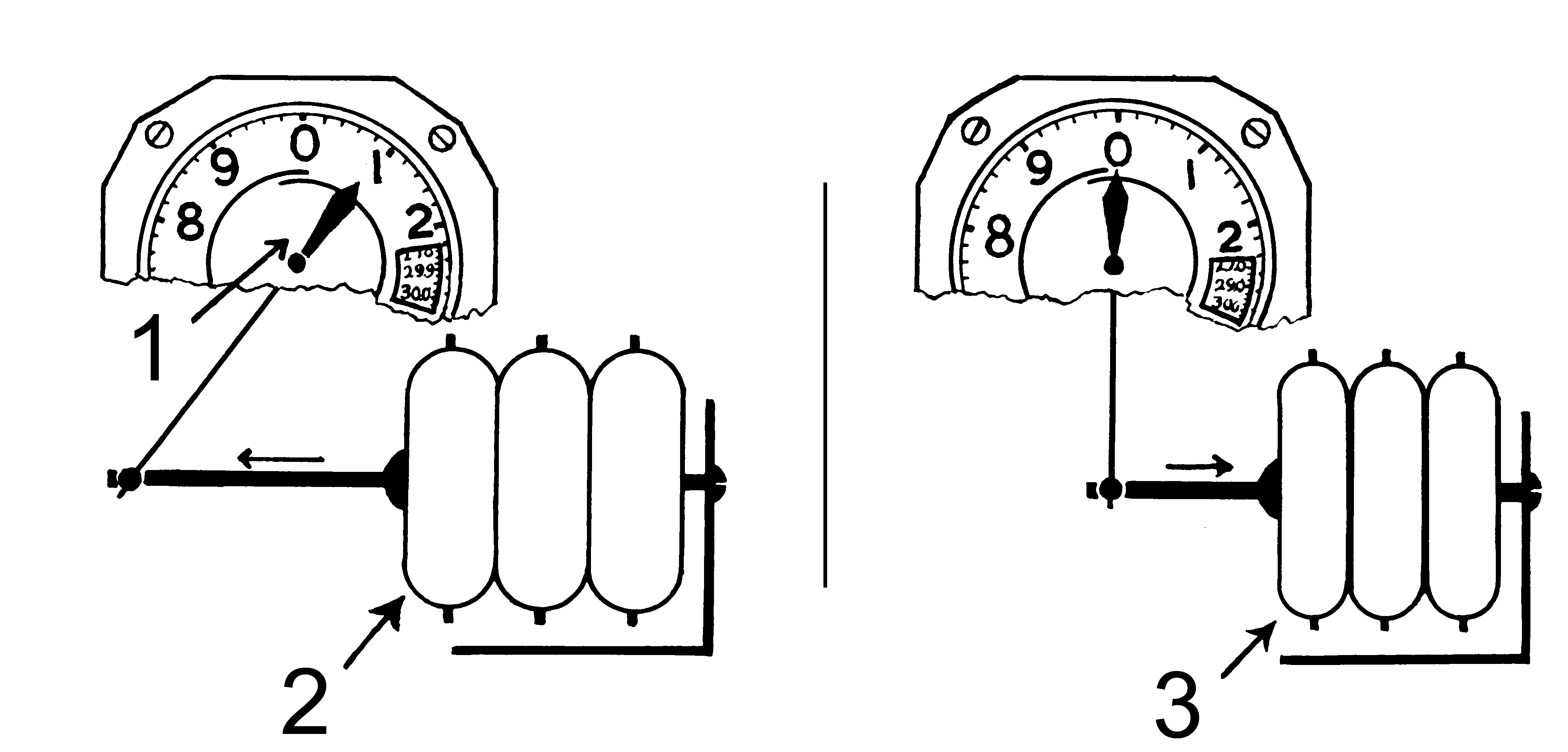
Line art diagram of an altimeter in action. Pointer Aneroid cell expanded Aneroid cell contracted

Altimeter setting is the value of the atmospheric pressure used to adjust the scale of a pressure altimeter so that it indicates the accurate height of an aircraft above a known reference surface. This reference can be the mean sea level pressure (QNH), the pressure at a nearby surface airport (QFE), or the "standard pressure level" of 1,013.25 hectopascals (29.92 inches of mercury) which gives pressure altitude and is used to maintain one of the standard flight levels.

The setting of a sensitive pressure altimeter is shown in the Kollsman window.

The QNH altimeter setting is one of the data included in METAR messages. Alternative settings are QFE and SPS/STD:

- QNH - is the barometric altimeter setting that causes an altimeter to read aircraft elevation above mean sea level - altitude (AMSL - above mean sea level) in ISA temperature conditions in the vicinity of the airfield that reported the QNH value.
- QFE - is the barometric altimeter setting that causes an altimeter to read zero when at the reference datum of a particular airfield (in practice, the reference datum is either an airfield center or a runway threshold). In ISA temperature conditions the altimeter will read the height above the airfield/runway in the vicinity of the airfield.
- SPS/STD - 'Standard Pressure Setting' or just 'Standard' refers to the altimeter being set to the standard pressure of 1013.25 hPa. It is the setting that causes an altimeter to read the aircraft's flight level (FL). Flight levels are given in hundreds of feet (for example: FL100 = 10 000 ft). Atmospheric pressure changes over time and position. Thus, the flight level is not "straight", because it has a different altitude (elevation above the mean sea level).

QNH and QFE are arbitrary Q codes rather than abbreviations, but the mnemonics "nautical height" (for QNH) and "field elevation" (for QFE) are often used by pilots to distinguish between them.

QNH and QFE will have errors when not at station elevation. QFF is aerodrome pressure (QNH) reduced to sea level. It is designed to read zero at sea level in the vicinity of the aerodrome, unlike QNH which will not read precisely zero at sea-level.

Related to the altimeter settings are:

- TA - Transition Altitude - altitude at which the pilot changes the aircraft's altimeter setting (usually from QNH) to standard pressure (1013.25 hPa)
- TL - Transition Level - the lowest flight level available for use above the transition altitude
- TLY - Transition Layer - the airspace between the transition altitude and the transition level
