= Maritime Mobile Service Q Codes =

Operating signals for abbreviated maritime communications

The Maritime Mobile Service Q Codes are part of a larger set of Q Codes designated by the ITU-R. The QOA–QQZ code range is reserved for the Maritime Mobile Service.

This assignment is specified in RECOMMENDATION ITU-R M.1172.

Although reserved for maritime service, the series from QOA to QQZ has not been used since 1967. Morse code is now very rarely used for maritime communications, but in isolated maritime regions like Antarctica and the South Pacific the use of Q Codes continues. Q Codes still work when HF voice circuits are not possible due to atmospherics and the nearest vessel is one ionospheric hop away.

From ITU Radio Regulations 1990, Appendix 14: Miscellaneous Abbreviations and Signals to Be Used for Radiocommunications in the Maritime Mobile Service.

	Question ?	Answer or Advice
QOA	Can you communicate by radiotelegraphy (500 kHz)?	I can communicate by radiotelegraphy (500 kHz).
QOB	Can you communicate by radiotelephony (2182 kHz)?	I can communicate by radiotelephony (2182 kHz).
QOC	Can you communicate by radiotelephony (channel 16 - frequency 156.80 MHz)?	I can communicate by radiotelephony (channel 16 - frequency 156.80 MHz).
QOD	Can you communicate with me in ...: 0. Dutch 5. Italian; 1. English 6. Japanese; 2. French 7. Norwegian; 3. German 8. Russian; 4. Greek 9. Spanish?	I can communicate with you in ...: 0. Dutch 5. Italian; 1. English 6. Japanese; 2. French 7. Norwegian; 3. German 8. Russian; 4. Greek 9. Spanish.
QOE	Have you received the safety signal sent by ... (name and/or call sign)?	I have received the safety signal sent by ... (name and/or call sign).
QOF	What is the commercial quality of my signals?	The quality of your signals is ...: 1. not commercial 2. marginally commercial 3. commercial.
QOG	How many tapes have you to send?	I have ... tapes to send.
QOH	Shall I send a phasing signal for ... seconds?	Send a phasing signal for ... seconds.
QOI	Shall I send my tape?	Send your tape.
QOJ	Will you listen on ... kHz (or MHz) for signals of emergency position-indicating radio beacons?	I am listening on ... kHz (or MHz) for signals of emergency position-indicating radio beacons.
QOK	Have you received the signals of an emergency position-indicating radio beacon on ... kHz (or MHz)?	I have received the signals of an emergency position-indicating radiobeacon on ... kHz (or MHz).
QOL	Is your vessel fitted for reception of selective calls? If so, what is your selective call number or signal?	My vessel is fitted for the reception of selective calls. My selective call number or signal is ...
QOM	On what frequencies can your vessel be reached by a selective call?	My vessel can be reached by a selective call on the following frequency/ies ... (periods of time to be added if necessary).
QOO	Can you send on any working frequency?	I can send on any working frequency.
QOT	Do you hear my call; what is the approximate delay in minutes before we may exchange traffic?	I hear your call; the approximate delay is ... minutes.
