= Aeronautical Code signals =

Brevity codes used for aviation

The Aeronautical Code signals are radio signal codes. They are part of a larger set of Q Codes allocated by the ITU-R during the International Telecommunication and Radio Conferences in Atlantic City 1947 in Appendix 9 "Miscellaneous Abbreviations and Signals to be used in Radiocommunications", and documented in the International Radio Regulations, Section I. Q Code. The QAA–QNZ code range includes phrases applicable primarily to the aeronautical service, as defined by the International Civil Aviation Organisation.

First defined by ICAO (International Civil Aviation Organization) in ICAO Doc-6100-COM/504/1" "Communication Codes and Abbreviations. Q Code" published 1952.April.01 and today superseded by ICAO Doc-8400 "Procedures for Air Navigation Services, ICAO Abbreviations and Codes". The majority of the Q codes published in ICAO Doc-6100 have slipped out of common use; for example today reports such as QAU ("I am about to jettison fuel") and QAZ ("I am flying in a storm") would be voice or computerized transmissions. But several remain part of the standard ICAO radiotelephony phraseology in aviation.

Altimeter settings
Code	Meaning	Sample use
QFE	The pressure set on the subscale of the altimeter so that the instrument indicates its height above the reference elevation being used [e.g. aerodrome elevation]	Runway in use 22 Left, QFE 990 hectopascals
QFF	Atmospheric pressure at a place, reduced to MSL using the actual temperature at the time of observation as the mean temperature.	
QNE	During conditions of exceptionally low atmospheric pressure it is not possible to set QFE or QNH on some aircraft altimeters. In these circumstances an aerodrome or runway QNE can be requested. The QNE is the reading in feet on an altimeter with the sub-scale set to 1013.2 hPa when the aircraft is at aerodrome or touchdown elevation.	
QNH	The pressure set on the subscale of the altimeter so that the instrument indicates its height above sea level (the altimeter will read runway elevation when the aircraft is on the runway).	Request Leeds QNH

Radio Navigation
Code	Meaning	Sample use
QDM	Magnetic bearing to a station	(callsign) request QDM (callsign)
QDL	Series of bearings taken at regular intervals	
QDR	Magnetic bearing from a station	(callsign) request QDR (callsign)
QFU	Magnetic bearing of the runway in use	Runway 22 in use, QFU 220
QGE	Distance	(callsign) request QGE (callsign)
QGH	Controlled Descent through Clouds (Royal Air Force use)	
QTE	True bearing/track from a station	(callsign) request QTE (callsign)
QTF	Position in relation to a point of reference or in latitude and longitude	
QUJ	True bearing/track to a station	(callsign) request QUJ (callsign)

Radio Procedures
Code	Meaning	Sample use
QGH	controller-interpreted DF let-down procedure, on UHF or VHF	
