= Analog front-end =

Analog signal conditioning circuitry

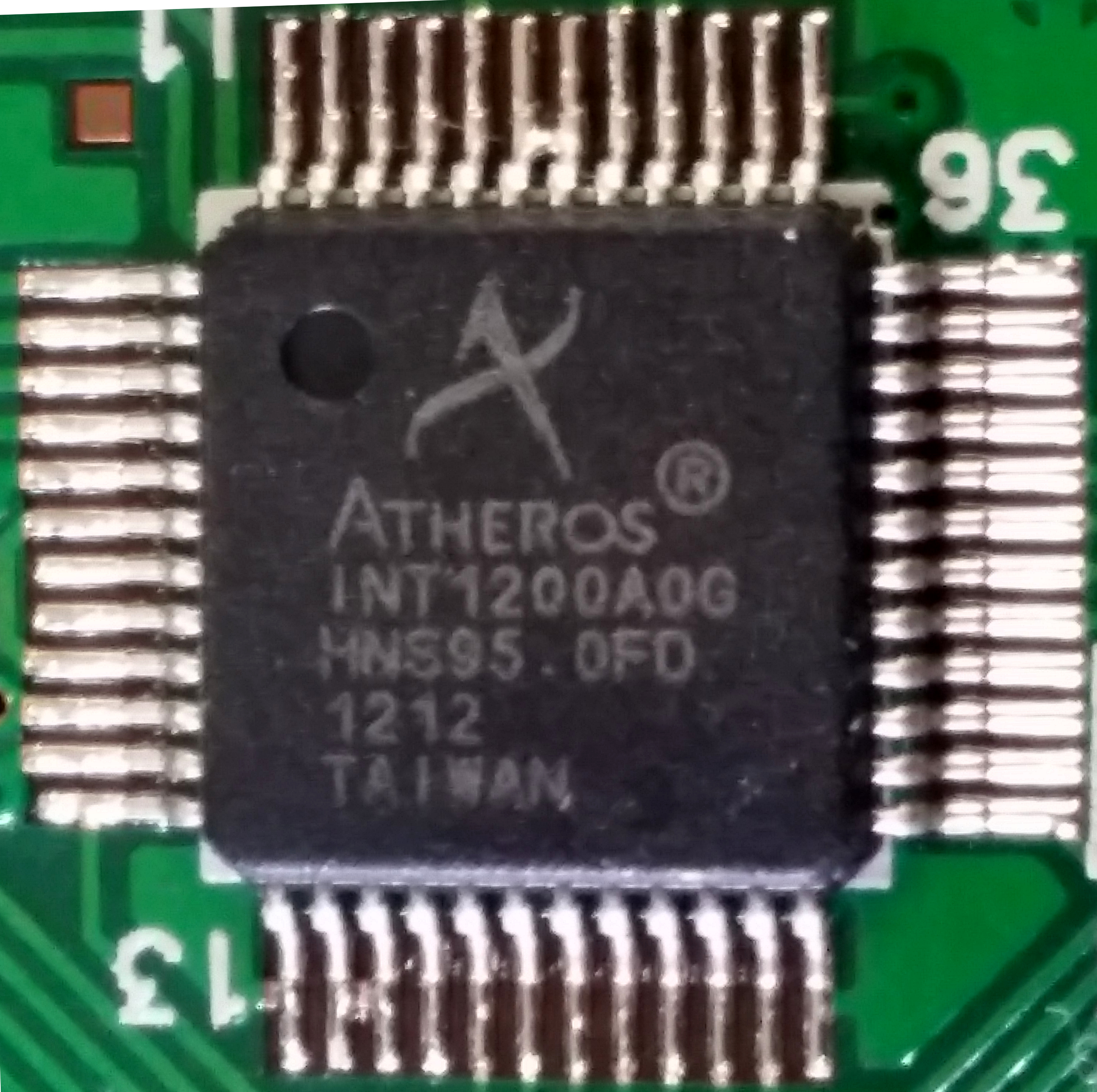
Atheros Intellon 1200 AFE-Chip as companion for an INT 5500 PowerLine-IC

An analog front-end (AFE or analog front-end controller AFEC) is a set of analog signal conditioning circuitry that uses sensitive analog amplifiers, often operational amplifiers, filters, and sometimes application-specific integrated circuits for sensors, radio receivers, and other circuits to provide a configurable and flexible electronics functional block needed to interface a variety of sensors to an antenna, analog-to-digital converter or, in some cases, to a microcontroller.

A radio frequency AFE is used in radio receivers, known as an RF front end.

== Modules ==
AFE hardware modules are used as interface sensors for many kinds of analog and digital systems, providing hardware modularity. For example, Texas Instruments markets health monitoring AFEs as the ADS1298, AFE4400 and AFE4490. Atmel markets analog front-ends for smart meters. Analog Devices markets a CN0209 product for test and measurement applications.
