= Q code =

Type of Morse code operating signal

The Q-code is a standardised collection of three-letter codes that each start with the letter "Q". It is an operating signal initially developed for commercial radiotelegraph communication (used e. g. by the Maritime Mobile Service or Amateur Radio Service), later also for TeleTYpe (TTY. e. g. for AFTN, the Aeronautical Fixed Telecommunications Network) and RadioTeleTYpe (RTTY e.g. used by the Maritime Mobile Service or Amateur Radio Service) and in voice communications (e.g. Aeronautical mobile service). Most Q-codes defined in 1947 are still in use today, date back to the International Telecommunication Convention in Atlantic City, 1947 and are standardized in the ITU International Radio Regulations from 1947 (ITU-RR).

== Early development ==
The original Q-codes were created, circa 1909, by the British government as a "List of abbreviations ... prepared for the use of British ships and coast stations licensed by the Postmaster General". The Q-codes facilitated communication between maritime radio operators speaking different languages, so they were soon adopted internationally. A total of forty-five Q-codes appeared in the "List of Abbreviations to be used in Radio Communications", which was included in the Service Regulations affixed to the Second International Radiotelegraph Convention in London (The convention was signed on July 5, 1912, and became effective July 1, 1913.)

The following table reviews a sample of the all-services Q-codes adopted by the 1912 convention:

First twelve Q-codes listed in the 1912 International Radiotelegraph Convention Regulations
Code	Question	Answer or notice
QRA	What ship or coast station is that?	This is ____.
QRB	What is your distance?	My distance is ____.
QRC	What is your true bearing?	My true bearing is ____ degrees.
QRD	Where are you bound for?	I am bound for ____.
QRF	Where are you bound from?	I am bound from ____.
QRG	What line do you belong to?	I belong to the ____ Line.
QRH	What is your wavelength in meters?	My wavelength is ____ meters.
QRJ	How many words have you to send?	I have ____ words to send.
QRK	How do you receive me?	I am receiving (1–5). (1) is unreadable and (5) is perfect.
QRL	Are you busy?	I am busy.
QRM	Are you being interfered with?	I am being interfered with.
QRN	Are the atmospherics strong?	Atmospherics (noise) are very strong.

== Later use ==
Over the years the original Q-codes were modified to reflect changes in radio practice. For example, QSW / QSX originally stood for, "Shall I increase / decrease my spark frequency?", but in the 1920s spark-gap transmitters were gradually being banned from land stations, making that meaning obsolete. By the 1970s, the Post Office Handbook for Radio Operators listed over a hundred Q-codes, covering a wide range of subjects including radio procedures, meteorology, radio direction finding, and search and rescue.

Some Q-codes are also used in aviation, in particular QNE, QNH and QFE, referring to certain altimeter settings. These codes are used in radiotelephone conversations with air traffic control as unambiguous shorthand, where safety and efficiency are of vital importance. A subset of Q-codes is used by the Miami-Dade County, Florida local government for law enforcement and fire rescue communications, one of the few instances where Q-codes are used in ground voice communication.

The QAA–QNZ code range includes phrases applicable primarily to the aeronautical service, as defined by the International Civil Aviation Organization. The QOA–QQZ code range is reserved for the maritime service. The QRA–QUZ code range includes phrases applicable to all services and is allocated to the International Telecommunication Union. QVA–QZZ are not allocated. Many codes have no immediate applicability outside one individual service, such as maritime operation (many QO or QU series codes) or radioteletype operation (the QJ series).

Many military and other organisations that use Morse code have adopted additional codes, including the Z code used by most European and NATO countries. The Z code adds commands and questions adapted for military radio transmissions, for example, "ZBW 2", which means "change to backup frequency number 2", and "ZNB abc", which means "my checksum is abc, what is yours?"

Used in their formal question / answer sense, the meaning of a Q-code varies depending on whether the individual Q-code is sent as a question or an answer. For example, the message "QRP?" means "Shall I decrease transmitter power?", and a reply of "QRP" means "Yes, decrease your transmitter power", whereas an unprompted statement "QRP" means "Please decrease your transmitter power". This structured use of Q-codes is fairly rare and now mainly limited to amateur radio and military Morse code (CW) traffic networks.

Under U.S. F.C.C. Regulations, CFR 47 97.113(a)(4), amateurs are not permitted to 'transmit codes or ciphers' (historical description), allowing only that 'plain-language communications' may be transmitted. The term 'Q-Signal' has been historically used in that context, not 'Q-Code,' - the use of 'Code' is technically a violation of F.C.C. Regulations. This essentially demonstrates the historic separation between Amateur and Commercial/Military radio services in the U.S.

== Use since the International Telecommunication Convention in Atlantic City, 1947 ==
The Q-code was first specified in ITU International Radio Regulations from 1947, Appendix 9, Section 1 which defines:

While some ranges of the Q-codes are for the use of all services, some bands of Q-codes were assigned specifically for the Aeronautical Mobile and the Maritime Mobile Service, which are:

"1. The series of groups QRA to QUZ listed in this Appendix, is for use by all services."

"2. The QAA to QNZ series are reserved for the aeronautical service and the QOA to QQZ series are reserved for the maritime services. These series are not listed in these regulations."

ICAO (International Civil Aviation Organization) specified the Q-codes for aeronautical purposes initially in COM/504/1 - Doc 6100. Amendment "Communication Codes and Abbreviations. Q Code" published 1952.April.01 While not all Q-codes published in 1952 in Doc-6100 are still in use today, the Q-codes used today are documented in ICAO DOC-8400, "ICAO Abbreviations and Codes"

The Q-codes for the Maritime Mobile Service used today are documented in ITU Recommendation ITU-R M.1172, "Miscellaneous Abbreviations and Signals to be used for Radiocommunications in the Maritime Mobile Service", 1995.

"5. Abbreviations are given the form of a question when followed by a question mark. When an abbreviation is used as a question and is followed by additional or complementary information, the question mark should follow this information."

"3. Certain abbreviations may be given an affirmative or negative sense by sending “C” or “N” respectively, immediately following the “Q” code abbreviation." To distinguish the use of a Q-code transmitted in radiotelegraphy communication as a question from the same Q-code transmitted as a statement, operators either prefixed it with the military network question marker "I̅N̅T̅" ( ▄ ▄ ▄▄▄ ▄ ▄▄▄ ) or suffixed it with the standard Morse question mark U̅D̅ ( ▄ ▄ ▄▄▄ ▄▄▄ ▄ ▄ ).

"4. The meanings assigned to “Q” code abbreviations may be amplified or completed by the addition of appropriate other groups, call signs, place names, figures, numbers, etc. It is optional to fill in the blanks shown in parentheses. Any data which is filled in where blanks appear should be sent in the same order as shown in the significations." For the Aeronautic Radio Service QNH 1015 identifies "QNH‡ "Altimeter Sub-Scale Setting to obtain Elevation when on the Ground" 1015 hPa.

"‡ "When radiotelephony is used, the abbreviations and terms are transmitted using the individual letters in non-phonetic form".

"7. All time should be given in Greenwich mean time (G.M.T.) unless otherwise indicated in the question or reply." GMT was replaced in 1972 by UTC (Universal Coordinated Time).

Although Q-codes were created when radio used Morse code exclusively, they continued to be employed after the introduction of voice transmissions. To avoid confusion, transmitter call signs are restricted; countries can be issued unused Q-Codes as their ITU prefix e.g. Qatar is QAT.

"Q" has no official meaning, but it is sometimes assigned a word with mnemonic value, such as "question" or "query", for example in QFE: "query field elevation".

== Listing according to service ==
- QAA to QNZ – Assigned by the International Civil Aviation Organization (ICAO).
- QNA to QNZ – The American Radio Relay League (ARRL) has also developed its own QN Signals for message handling located in this range. Even though they overlap with other signals, the ARRL determined that their exclusive use in NTS nets limits confusion.
- QOA to QQZ – For the Maritime Mobile Service.
- QRA to QUZ – Assigned by the International Telecommunication Union Radiocommunication Sector (ITU-R).

=== Aeronautical Code signals (QAA–QNZ; ICAO) ===
First defined in ICAO publication "Doc 6100-COM/504/1" and in "ICAO Procedures for Air Navigation Services, Abbreviations and Codes (PANS-ABC)" [Doc8400-4] (4th edition 1989), the majority of the Q-codes have fallen out of common use; for example today reports such as QAU ("I am about to jettison fuel") and QAZ ("I am flying in a storm") would be voice or computerised transmissions. But several remain part of the standard ICAO radiotelephony phraseology in aviation. These are also part of ACP131, which lists all ITU-R Q-codes, without grouping them by aeronautical/marine/general use. The currently applicable version of ICAO Doc-8400 has the title "Procedures for Air Navigation Services, ICAO Abbreviations"

and Codes, edition 8, 2010.November.18

	Question?	Answer or advice
QAB	May I have clearance (for ____) from ____ (place) to ____ (place) at flight level/altitude ____ ?	You are cleared (or ____ is cleared) by ____ from ____ (place) to ____ (place) at flight level/altitude ____.
QAF	Will you advise me when you are (were) at (over) ____ (place)?	I am (was) at (over) ____ (place) (at ____ hours) at flight level / altitude ____.
QAG		Arrange your flight in order to arrive over ____ (place) at ____ hours. or I am arranging my flight in order to arrive over ____ (place) at ____ hours.
QAH	What is your height above ____ (datum)?	I am at ____ flight level / altitude ____. or Arrange your flight so as to reach flight level / altitude ____ at ____ (hours or place).
QAI	What is the essential traffic respecting my aircraft?	The essential traffic respecting your aircraft is ____.
QAK	Is there any risk of collision?	There is risk of collision.
QAL	Are you going to land at ____ (place)? or Has aircraft ____ landed at ____ (place)?	I am going to land at ____ (place). or (You may) land at ____ (place). or Aircraft ____ landed at ____ (place).
QAM	What is the latest available meteorological observation for ____ (place)?	Meteorological observation made at ____ (place) at ____ hours was as follows ____. (Note: The information in response to QAM? may be given in Q-code form or METAR format.)
QAN	What is the surface wind direction and speed at ____ (place)?	The surface wind direction and speed at ____ (place) at ____ hours is ____ (direction) ____ (speed).
QAO	What is the wind direction in degrees TRUE and speed at ____ (position or zone/s) at each of the ____ (figures) ____ (units) levels above ____ (datum)?	The wind direction and speed at (position or zone/s) at flight level/altitude ____ is: ____ (vertical distance) ____ degrees TRUE ____ (speed).
QAP	Shall I listen for you (or for ____) on ____ kHz (____ MHz)?	Listen for me (or for ____) on ____ kHz (____ MHz).
QAQ	Am I near a prohibited, restricted, or danger area? or Am I near area ____ (identification of area)?	You are ____ (number) area ____ (identification of area).: 1. near 2. flying within
QAR	May I stop listening on the watch frequency for ____ minutes?	You may stop listening on the watch frequency for ____ minutes.
QAU	Where may I jettison fuel?	I am about to jettison fuel. or Jettison fuel in ____ (area).
QAW		I am about to carry out overshoot procedure.
QAY	Will you advise me when you pass (passed) ____ (place) bearing 090 (270) degrees relative to your heading?	I passed ____ (place) bearing ____ degrees relative to my heading at ____ hours.
QAZ	Are you experiencing communication difficulties through flying in a storm?	I am experiencing communication difficulties through flying in a storm.
QBA	What is the horizontal visibility at ____ (place)?	The horizontal visibility at ____ (place) at ____ hours is ____ (distance figures and units).
QBB	What is the amount, type and height above official aerodrome elevation of the base of the cloud [at ____ (place)]?	The amount, type and height above official aerodrome elevation of the base of the cloud at ____ (place) at ____ hours is: ____ eights (____ type) at ____ (figures and units) height above official aerodrome elevation.
QBC	Report meteorological conditions as observed from your aircraft [at ____ (position or zone)] [(at ____ hours)].	The meteorological conditions as observed from my aircraft at ____ (position or zone) at ____ hours at ____ (figures and units) height above ____ (datum) are ____. (Note: The answer to QBC is required to be an AIREP format message.)
QBD	How much fuel have you remaining (expressed as hours and/or minutes of consumption)?	My fuel will endure for ____ (hours and/or minutes).
QBE		I am about to wind in my aerial.
QBF	Are you flying in cloud?	I am flying in cloud at ____ flight level/altitude ____ [and I am ascending (descending) to flight level/altitude ____].
QBG	Are you flying above cloud?	I am flying above cloud and at flight level/altitude ____. or Maintain a vertical distance of ____ (figures and units) above clouds, smoke, haze or fog levels.
QBH	Are you flying below cloud?	I am flying below cloud and at flight level/altitude ____. or Maintain a vertical distance of ____ (figures and units) below cloud.
QBI	Is flight under IFR compulsory at ____ (place) [or from ____ to ____ (place)]?	Flight under IFR is compulsory at ____ (place) [or from ____ to ____ (place)].
QBJ	What is the amount, type and height above ____ (datum) of the top of the cloud [at ____ (position or zone)]?	At ____ hours at ____ (position or zone) the top of the cloud is: amount ____ eights (____ type) at ____ (figures and units) height above ____ (datum).
QBK	Are you flying with no cloud in your vicinity?	I am flying with no cloud in my vicinity and at flight level/altitude ____.
QBM	Has ____ sent any messages for me?	Here is the message sent by ____ at ____ hours.
QBN	Are you flying between two layers of cloud?	I am flying between two layers of cloud and at flight level / altitude ____.
QBO	What is the nearest aerodrome at which flight under VFR is permissible and which would be suitable for my landing?	Flying under VFR is permissible at ____ (place) which would be suitable for your landing.
QBP	Are you flying in and out of cloud?	I am flying in and out of cloud and at flight level/altitude ____.
QBS		Ascend (or descend) to ____ (figures and units) height above ____ (datum) before encountering instrument meteorological conditions or if visibility falls below ____ (distance figures and units) and advise.
QBT	What is the runway visual range at ____ (place)?	The runway visual range at ____ (place) at ____ hours is ____ (distance figures and units).
QBV	Have you reached flight level/altitude ____ [or ____ (area or place)]?	I have reached ____ flight level/altitude ____ [or ____ (area or place)]. or Report reaching flight level/altitude ____ [or ____ (area or place)].
QBX	Have you left ____ flight level/altitude ____ [or ____ (area or place)]?	I have left ____ flight level/altitude ____ [or ____ (area or place)]. or Report leaving flight level/altitude ____ [or ____ (area or place)].
QBZ	Report your flying conditions in relation to clouds.	The reply to QBZ ? is given by the appropriate answer form of signals QBF, QBG, QBH, QBK, QBN and QBP.
QCA	May I change my flight level/altitude from ____ to ____ ?	You may change your flight level/altitude from ____ to ____ or I am changing my flight level/altitude from ____ to ____.
QCB		Delay is being caused by ____.: 1. you're transmitting out of turn.; 2. your slowness in answering.; 3. lack of your reply to my ____.
QCE	When may I expect approach clearance?	Expect approach clearance at ____ hours. or No delay expected.
QCF		Delay indefinite. Expect approach clearance not later than ____ hours.
QCH	May I taxi to ____ (place)?	Cleared to taxi to ____ (place).
QCI		Make a 360-degree turn immediately (turning to the ____). or I am making a 360-degree turn immediately (turning to the ____).
QCS		My reception on ____ frequency has broken down.
QCX	What is your full call sign?	My full call sign is ____ . or Use your full call sign until further notice.
QCY		I am working on a trailing aerial. or Work on a trailing aerial.
QDB	Have you sent message ____ to ____ ?	I have sent message ____ to ____.
QDF	What is your D-Value at ____ (position)? or What is the D-Value at ____ (place or position) (at ____ hours) for the ____ millibar level?	My D-Value at ____ (position) at ____ (figures and units) height above the 1013.2 millibars datum is ____ (D-Value figures and units) ____ (specify plus or minus). or The D-Value at ____ (place or position) at ____ hours for the ____ millibar level is (D-Value figures and units) ____ (specify plus or minus). (Note: When responding to QDF if the true altitude (radio altitude) is greater than the pressure altitude PS (Plus) is used and when it is less MS (Minus) is used.)
QDL	Do you intend to ask me for a series of bearings?	I intend to ask you for a series of bearings.
QDM	Will you indicate the magnetic heading for me to steer towards you (or ____) with no wind?	The magnetic heading for you to steer to reach me (or ____) with no wind was ____ degrees (at ____ hours).
QDP	Will you accept control (or responsibility) of (for) ____ now (or at ____ hours)?	I will accept control (or responsibility) of (for) ____ now (or at ____ hours).
QDR	What is my magnetic bearing from you (or from ____)?	Your magnetic bearing from me (or from ____) was ____ degrees (at ____ hours).
QDT	Are you flying in visual meteorological condition?	I am flying in visual meteorological condition. or You are cleared subject to maintaining own separation and visual meteorological conditions.
QDU		Cancelling my IFR flight. or IFR flight cancelled at ____ (time).
QDV	Are you flying in a flight visibility of less than ____ (figures and units)?	I am flying in a flight visibility of less than ____ (figures and units) at flight level/altitude ____
QEA	May I cross the runway ahead of me?	You may cross the runway ahead of you.
QEB	May I turn at the intersection?	Taxi as follows at the intersection ____. (straight ahead DRT turn left LEFT turn right RIGHT).
QEC	May I make a 180-degree turn and return down the runway?	You may make a 180-degree turn and return down the runway.
QED	Shall I follow the pilot vehicle?	Follow the pilot vehicle.
QEF	Have I reached my parking area? or Have you reached your parking area?	You have reached your parking area. or I have reached my parking area.
QEG	May I leave the parking area? or Have you left the parking area?	You may leave the parking area. or I have left the parking area.
QEH	May I move to the holding position for runway number ____ ? or Have you moved to the holding position for runway number ____ ?	Cleared to the holding position for runway number ____ or I have moved to the holding position for runway number ____.
QEJ	May I assume position for take-off? or Have you assumed position for take-off?	Cleared to hold at take-off position for runway number ____. or I am assuming take-off position for runway number ____ and am holding.
QEK	Are you ready for immediate take-off?	I am ready for immediate take-off.
QEL	May I take-off (and make a ____ hand turn after take-off)?	You are cleared to take-off (turn as follows after take-off ____).
QEM	What is the condition of the landing surface at ____ (place)?	The condition of the landing surface at ____ (place) is ____. (Note: The format for response to QEM is sent as appropriate NOTAM code groups.)
QEN	Shall I hold my position?	Hold your position
QEO	Shall I clear the runway (or landing area)? or Have you cleared the runway (or landing area)?	Clear the runway (or landing area). or I have cleared the runway (or landing area).
QES	Is a right-hand circuit in force at ____ (place)?	A right-hand circuit is in force at ____ (place).
QFA	What is the meteorological forecast for ____ (flight, route, section of route or zone) for the period ____ hours until ____ hours?	The meteorological forecast for ____ (flight, route, section of route or zone) for the period ____ hours until ____ hours is ____.
QFB		The ____; 1) approach 2) runway 3) approach and runway lights are out of order.
QFC	What is the amount, the type and the height above ____ (datum) of the base of the cloud at ____ (place, position or zone)?	At ____ (place, position or zone) the base of the cloud is ____ eighths ____ type at ____ (figures and units) height above ____ (datum).
QFD	1. Is the ____ visual beacon [at ____ (place)] in operation?; 2. Will you switch on the ____ visual beacon [at ____ (place)]?; 3. Will you extinguish the aerodrome visual beacon [at ____ (place)] until I have landed?	1. The ____ visual beacon [at ____ (place)] is in operation 2. I will extinguish the aerodrome visual beacon [at ____ (place)] until your landing is completed.
QFE	What should I set on the subscale of my altimeter so that the instrument would indicate its height above the reference elevation being used?	If you set the subscale of your altimeter to read ____ millibars, the instrument would indicate its height above aerodrome elevation (above threshold, runway number ____).
QFF	[At ____ (place)] what is the present atmospheric pressure converted to mean sea level in accordance with meteorological practice?	At ____ (place) the atmospheric pressure converted to mean sea level in accordance with meteorological practice is (or was determined at ____ hours to be) ____ millibars.
QFG	Am I overhead?	You are overhead.
QFH	May I descend below the clouds?	You may descend below the clouds.
QFI	Are the aerodrome lights lit?	The aerodrome lights are lit. or Please light the aerodrome lights.
QFL	Will you send up pyrotechnical lights?	I will send up pyrotechnical lights.
QFM	What flight level/altitude ____.: 1. should I maintain?; 2. are you maintaining?; 3. do you intend cruising at?	____ ____.: 1. Maintain (or fly at) flight level / altitude ____.; 2. I am maintaining flight level / altitude ____; 3. I intend cruising at flight level/altitude ____.
QFO	May I land immediately?	You may land immediately.
QFP	Will you give me the latest information concerning ____ facility [at ____ (place)]?	The latest information concerning ____ facility [at ____ (place)] is as follows ____. (Note: The response format to QFP is sent using appropriate NOTAM code groups.)
QFQ	Are the approach and runway lights lit?	The approach and runway lights are lit. or Please light the approach and runway lights.
QFR	Does my landing gear appear damaged?	Your landing gear appears damaged.
QFS	Is the radio facility at ____ (place) in operation?	The radio facility at ____ (place) is in operation (or will be in operation in ____ hours). or Please have the ____ radio facility at ____ (place) put in operation.
QFT	Between what heights above ____ (datum) has ice formation been observed [at ____ (position or zone)]?	Ice formation has been observed at ____ (position or zone) in the type of ____ and with an accretion rate of ____ between ____ (figures and units) and ____ (figures and units) heights above ____ (datum).
QFU	What is the magnetic direction (or runway number) of the runway to be used?	The magnetic direction (or runway number) of the runway to be used is ____. (Note: In response to QFU the runway number is always indicated by a two-figure group and the magnetic direction by a three-figure group.)
QFV	Are the floodlights switched on?	The floodlights are switched on. or Please switch on the floodlights.
QFW	What is the length of the runway in use in ____ (units)?	The length of runway ____ now in use is ____ (figures and units).
QFX		I am working (or am going to work) on a fixed aerial. or Work on a fixed aerial.
QFY	Please report the present meteorological landing conditions [at ____ (place)].	The present meteorological landing conditions at ____ (place) are ____. (Note: When responding to QFY using other Q-codes, the information is sent in the following order: QAN, QBA, QNY, QBB, QNH and / or QFE and, if necessary, QMU, QNT, QBJ.)
QFZ	What is the aerodrome meteorological forecast for ____ (place) for the period ____ hours until ____ hours?	The aerodrome meteorological forecast for ____ (place) for the period ____ hours until ____ hours is ____. (Note: When responding to QFZ using Q-codes the following sequence of answer (or advice) forms is to be used: QAN, QBA, QNY, QBB and, if necessary, QMU, QNT and QBJ.)
QGC		There are obstructions to the ____ of ____ runway ____.
QGD	Are there on my track any obstructions whose elevation equals or exceeds my altitude?	There are obstructions on your track ____ (figures and units) height above ____ (datum).
QGE	What is my distance to your station (or to ____)?	Your distance to my station (or to ____) is ____ (distance figures and units).
QGH	May I land using ____ (procedure or facility)?	You may land using ____ (procedure or facility).
QGK	What track should I make good? or What track are you making good?	Make good a track from ____ (place) on ____ degrees ____ (true or magnetic). or I am making good a track from ____ (place) on ____ degrees ____ (true or magnetic).
QGL	May I enter the ____ (control area or zone) at ____ (place)?	You may enter the ____ (control area or zone) at ____ (place).
QGM		Leave the ____ (control area or zone).
QGN	May I be cleared to land [at ____ (place)]?	You are cleared to land [at ____ (place)].
QGO		Landing is prohibited at ____ (place).
QGP	What is my number for landing?	You are number ____ to land.
QGQ	May I hold at ____ (place)?	Hold at ____ (place) at flight level/altitude ____ (datum) and await further clearance.
QGT		Fly for ____ minutes on a heading what will enable you to maintain a track reciprocal to your present one.
QGU		Fly for ____ minutes on a magnetic heading of ____ degrees.
QGV	Do you see me? or Can you see the aerodrome? or Can you see ____ (aircraft)?	I see you at ____ (cardinal or quadrantal point of direction). or I can see the aerodrome. or I can see ____ (aircraft).
QGW	Does my landing gear appear to be down and in place?	Your landing gear appears to be down and in place.
QGZ		Hold on ____ direction of ____ facility.
QHE	Will you inform me when you are on ____ leg of approach?	I am on ____ of approach.: 1. cross-wind leg 2. down-wind leg 3. base leg 4. final leg
QHG	May I enter traffic circuit at flight level/altitude ____?	Cleared to enter traffic circuit at flight level/altitude ____.
QHH	Are you making an emergency landing?	I am making an emergency landing. or Emergency landing being made at ____ (place). All aircraft below flight level/altitude ____ and within a distance of ____ (figures and units) leave ____ (place or headings).
QHI	Are you [or is ____(place)] ____.: 1. waterborne?; 2. on land?	I am [or ____ (place) is] ____ at ____ hours.: 1. waterborne 2. on land
QHQ	May I make a ____ approach [at ____ (place)]? or Are you making a ____ approach?	You may make a ____ approach [at ____ (place)]. or I am making a ____ approach.
QHZ	Shall I circle the aerodrome (or go around)?	Circle the aerodrome (or go around).
QIC	May I establish communication with ____ radio station on ____ kHz (or MHz) [now or at ____ hours]?	Establish communication with ____ radio station on ____ kHz. (or MHz) [now or at ____ hours]. or I will establish communication with ____ radio station on ____ kHz (or MHz) [now or at ____ hours].
QIF	What frequency is ____ using?	____ is using ____ kHz (or MHz).
QJA	Is my ____ reversed?: 1. tape 2. mark and space	Your ____ is reversed.: 1. tape 2. mark and space
QJB	Will you use ____.: 1. radio?; 2. cable?; 3. telegraph?; 4. teletypewriter?; 5. telephone?; 6. receiver?; 7. transmitter?; 8. reperforator?	I will use ____.: 1. radio.; 2. cable.; 3. telegraph.; 4. teletypewriter.; 5. telephone.; 6. receiver.; 7. transmitter.; 8. reperforator.
QJC	Will you check your ____.: 1. transmitter distributor?; 2. auto-head?; 3. perforator?; 4. reperforator?; 5. printer?; 6. printer motor?; 7. keyboard?; 8. antenna system?	I will check my ____.: 1. transmitter distributor.; 2. auto-head.; 3. perforator.; 4. reperforator.; 5. printer.; 6. printer motor.; 7. keyboard.; 8. antenna system.
QJD	Am I transmitting ____.: 1. in letters?; 2. in figures?	You are transmitting ____.: 1. in letters 2. in figures.
QJE	Is my frequency shift ____.: 1. too wide?; 2. too narrow?; 3. correct?	Your frequency shift is ____.: 1. too wide.; 2. too narrow (by ____ cycles).; 3. correct.
QJF		My signal as checked by monitor ____ is satisfactory ____.: 1. locally.; 2. as radiated.
QJG	Shall I revert to automatic relay?	Revert to automatic relay.
QJH	Shall I run ____; 1. my test tape?: 2. a test sentence?	Run ____; 1. your test tape.: 2. a test sentence.
QJI	Will you transmit a continuous ____.: 1. mark?; 2. space?	I am transmitting a continuous ____.: 1. mark.; 2. space.
QJK	Are you receiving ____.: 1. a continuous mark?; 2. a continuous space?; 3. a mark bias?; 4. a space bias?	I am receiving ____.: 1. a continuous mark.; 2. a continuous space.; 3. a mark bias.; 4. a space bias.
QKC		The sea conditions (at ____ position) ____.: 1. permit alighting but not take-off.; 2. render alighting extremely hazardous.
QKF	May I be relieved (at ____ hours)?	You may expect to be relieved at ____ hours [by ____].: 1. aircraft ____ (identification) (type ____); 2. [vessel whose call sign is ____ (call sign)] and / or [whose name is ____ (name)].
QKG	Will relief take place when ____ (identification) establishes ____.: 1. visual, 2. communications, contact with survivors?	Relief will take place when ____ (identification) establishes ____.: 1. visual, 2. communications, contact with survivors.
QKH	Report details of the parallel sweep (track) search being (or to be) conducted? or In the parallel sweep (track) search being (or to be) conducted, what is (are) ____.: 1. the direction of sweeps, 2. the separation between sweeps, 3. the flight level/altitude ____ employed in the search pattern?	The parallel sweep (track) search is being (or to be) conducted ____.: 1. with direction of sweeps ____ degrees ____ (true or magnetic).; 2. with ____ (distance figures and units) separation between sweeps.; 3. at flight level/altitude ____.
QKN		Aircraft plotted (believed to be you) in position ____ on track ____ degrees at ____ hours.
QKO	What other units are (or will be) taking part in the operation [____ (identification of operation)]?	In the operation [____ (identification)], the following units are (or will be) taking part ____ (name of units). or ____ (name) unit is taking part in operation [____ (identification] (with effect from ____ hours).
QKP	Which pattern of search is being followed?	The search pattern is ____.: 1. parallel sweep.; 2. square search.; 3. creeping line ahead.; 4. track crawl.; 5. contour search.; 6. combined search by aircraft and ship.; 7. ____ (specify).
QLB	Will you monitor ____ station and report regarding range, quality, etc.?	I have monitored ____ station and report (briefly) as follows ____.
QLH	Will you use simultaneous keying on ____ frequency and ____ frequency?	I will now key simultaneously on ____ frequency and ____ frequency.
QLV	Is the ____ radio facility still required?	The ____ radio facility is still required.
QMH		Shift to transmit and receive on ____ kHz (or ____ MHz.); if communication is not established within 5 minutes, revert to present frequency.
QMI	Report the vertical distribution of cloud [at ____ (position or zone)] as observed from your aircraft.	The vertical distribution of cloud as observed from my aircraft at ____ hours at ____.(position or zone) is : lowest layer observed* ____ eights (____ type) with base of ____ (figures and units) and tops of ____ (figures and units) [*and similarly in sequence for each of the layers observed.] height above ____ (datum).
QMU	What is the surface temperature at ____ (place) and what is the dew point temperature at that place?	The surface temperature at ____ (place) at ____ hours is ____ degrees and the dew point temperature at that time and place is ____ degrees.
QMW	At ____ (position or zone) what is (are) the flight level(s)/altitude(s) ____ of the zero Celsius isotherm(s)?	At ____ (position or zone) the zero Celsius isotherm(s) is (are) at flight level(s)/altitude(s) ____.
QMX	What is the air temperature [at ____ (position or zone)] (at ____ hours) at flight level/altitude ____?	At ____ (position or zone) at ____ hours the air temperature is ____ (degrees and units) at flight level/altitude ____. (Note: Aircraft reporting QMX information will transmit the temperature figures as corrected for airspeed.)
QMZ	Have you any amendments to the flight forecast in respect of section of route yet to be traversed?	The following amendment(s) should be made to the flight forecast ____. (Note: If no amendments, respond to QMZ? with signal QMZ NIL.)
QNE	What indication will my altimeter give on landing at ____ (place) at ____ hours, my sub-scale being set to 1013.2 millibars (29.92 inches)?	On landing at ____ (place) at ____ hours, with your sub-scale being set to 1013.2 millibars (29.92 inches), your altimeter will indicate ____ (figures and units).
QNH	What should I set on the subscale of my altimeter so that the instrument would indicate its elevation if my aircraft were on the ground at your station?	If you set the subscale of your altimeter to read ____ millibars, the instrument would indicate its elevation if your aircraft were on the ground at my station at ____ hours. (Note: When the setting in response to QNH? is given in hundredths of an inch (instead of millibars), the abbreviation "INS" is used to identify the units.)
QNI	Between what heights above ____ (datum) has turbulence been observed at ____ (position or zone)?	Turbulence has been observed at ____ (position or zone) with an intensity of ____ between ____ (figures and units) and ____ (figures and units) heights above ____ (datum).
QNO		I am not equipped to give the information (or provide the facility) requested.
QNR		I am approaching my point of no return.
QNT	What is the maximum speed of the surface wind at ____ (place)?	The maximum speed of the surface wind at ____ (place) at ____ hours is ____ (speed figures and units).
QNY	What is the present weather and the intensity thereof at ____ (place, position or zone)?	The present weather and intensity thereof at ____ (place, position or zone) at ____ hours is ____. (Note: Regarding response to QNY?: When present weather information is transmitted by a ground station, the abbreviations shall be selected from those specified in Annex 3, paragraph 4.8.2.; When present weather information is transmitted by an aircraft, the information shall be selected from items 10–12 of the AIREP form.)

=== Maritime Mobile Service (QOA–QQZ) ===
This assignment is specified in RECOMMENDATION ITU-R M.1172.

Although reserved for maritime service, the series from QOA to QQZ has not been used since 1967. Morse code is now very rarely used for maritime communications, but in isolated maritime regions like Antarctica and the South Pacific the use of Q-codes continues. Q-codes still work when HF voice circuits are not possible due to atmospherics and the nearest vessel is one ionospheric hop away.

	Question ?	Answer or advice
QOA	Can you communicate by radiotelegraphy (500 kHz)?	I can communicate by radiotelegraphy (500 kHz).
QOB	Can you communicate by radiotelephony (2.182 MHz)?	I can communicate by radiotelephony (2.182 MHz).
QOC	Can you communicate by radiotelephony (channel 16 – frequency 156.8 MHz)?	I can communicate by radiotelephony (channel 16 – frequency 156.8 MHz).
QOD	Can you communicate with me in ____?: 0. Dutch / 5. Italian; 1. English / 6. Japanese; 2. French / 7. Norwegian; 3. German / 8. Russian; 4. Greek / 9. Spanish	I can communicate with you in ____.: 0. Dutch / 5. Italian; 1. English / 6. Japanese; 2. French / 7. Norwegian; 3. German / 8. Russian; 4. Greek / 9. Spanish
QOE	Have you received the safety signal sent by ____ (name and/or call sign)?	I have received the safety signal sent by ____ (name and/or call sign).
QOF	What is the commercial quality of my signals?	The quality of your signals is ____.: 1. not commercial 2. marginally commercial 3. commercial.
QOG	How many tapes have you to send?	I have ____ tapes to send.
QOH	Shall I send a phasing signal for ____ seconds?	Send a phasing signal for ____ seconds.
QOI	Shall I send my tape?	Send your tape.
QOJ	Will you listen on ____ kHz (or MHz) for signals of emergency position-indicating radiobeacons?	I am listening on ____ kHz (or MHz) for signals of emergency position-indicating radiobeacons.
QOK	Have you received the signals of an emergency position-indicating radiobeacon on ____ kHz (or MHz)?	I have received the signals of an emergency position-indicating radiobeacon on ____ kHz (or MHz).
QOL	Is your vessel fitted for reception of selective calls? If so, what is your selective call number or signal?	My vessel is fitted for the reception of selective calls. My selective call number or signal is ____.
QOM	On what frequencies can your vessel be reached by a selective call?	My vessel can be reached by a selective call on the following frequency/ies ____ (periods of time to be added if necessary).
QOO	Can you send on any working frequency?	I can send on any working frequency.
QOT	Do you hear my call; what is the approximate delay in minutes before we may exchange traffic?	I hear your call; the approximate delay is ____ minutes.

=== All services (QRA–QUZ) ===
First defined by the Washington 1927 ITU Radio Regulations. Later defined by ITU-R in Appendix 9 to the Radio Regulations Annex to the International Telecommunications Convention (Atlantic City, 1947). The current callsign table is found in ITU-R Appendix 42. Current interpretation of the Q-code can be found in ITU-R Appendices 14 and 15.

ITU Radio Regulations 1990, Appendix 13: Miscellaneous Abbreviations and Signals to be Used in Radiotelegraphy Communications Except in the Maritime Mobile Service:

	Question ?	Answer or advice
QRA	What is the name of your vessel (or station)?	The name of my vessel (or station) is ____.
QRB	How far approximately are you from my station?	The approximate distance between our stations is ____ nautical miles (or km).
QRC	By what private enterprise (or state administration) are the accounts for charges for your station settled?	The accounts for charges of my station are settled by the private enterprise ____ (or state administration).
QRD	Where are you bound for and where are you from?	I am bound for ____ from ____.
QRE	What is your estimated time of arrival at ____ (or over ____) (place)?	My estimated time of arrival at ____ (or over ____) (place) is ____ hours.
QRF	Are you returning to ____ (place)?	I am returning to ____ (place). or Return to ____ (place).
QRG	Will you tell me my exact frequency (or that of ____)?	Your exact frequency (or that of ____) is ____ kHz (or MHz).
QRH	Does my frequency vary?	Your frequency varies.
QRI	How is the tone of my transmission?	The tone of your transmission is ____.: 1. good; 2. variable; 3. bad
QRJ	How many radiotelephone calls have you to book?	I have ____ radiotelephone calls to book.
QRK	What is the intelligibility of my signals (or those of ____)?	The intelligibility of your signals (or those of ____) is ____: 1. bad; 2. poor; 3. fair; 4. good; 5. excellent
QRL	Are you busy?	I am busy (or I am busy with ____). Please do not interfere.
QRM	Are you being interfered with? or Is my transmission being interfered with?	I am being interfered with or Your transmission is being interfered with ____.: 1. nil; 2. slightly; 3. moderately; 4. severely; 5. extremely
QRN	Are you troubled by static?	I am troubled by static (____).: 1. nil; 2. slightly; 3. moderately; 4. severely; 5. extremely
QRO	Shall I increase transmitter power?	Increase transmitter power.
QRP	Shall I decrease transmitter power?	Decrease transmitter power.
QRQ	Shall I send faster?	Send faster (____ words per minute).
QRR	Are you ready for automatic operation?	I am ready for automatic operation. Send at ____ words per minute.
QRS	Shall I send more slowly?	Send more slowly (____ words per minute).
QRT	Shall I stop sending?	Stop sending.
QRU	Have you anything for me?	I have nothing for you.
QRV	Are you ready?	I am ready.
QRW	Shall I inform ____ that you are calling him on ____ kHz (or MHz)?	Please inform ____ that I am calling him on ____ kHz (or MHz).
QRX	When will you call me again?	I will call you again at ____ hours (on ____ kHz (or MHz)).
QRY	What is my turn? (relates to shared communication networks).	Your turn is number ____ (or according to any other indication). (relates to shared communication networks).
QRZ	Who is calling me?	You are being called by ____ (on ____ kHz (or MHz)).
QSA	What is the strength of my signals (or those of ____)?	The strength of your signals (or those of ____) is ____.: 1. scarcely perceptible; 2. weak; 3. fairly good; 4. good; 5. very good
QSB	Are my signals fading?	Your signals are fading.
QSC	Are you a cargo vessel? or Are you a low traffic ship?	I am a cargo vessel. or I am a low traffic ship.
QSD	Is my keying defective? or Are my signals mutilated?	Your keying is defective. or Your signals are mutilated.
QSE*	What is the estimated drift of the survival craft?	The estimated drift of the survival craft is ____ (figures and units).
QSF*	Have you effected rescue?	I have effected rescue and am proceeding to ____ base (with ____ persons injured requiring ambulance).
QSG	Shall I send ____ telegrams at a time?	Send ____ telegrams at a time.
QSH	Are you able to home on your direction-finding equipment?	I am able to home on my D/F equipment (on station ____).
QSI		I have been unable to break in on your transmission. or Will you inform ____ (call sign) that I have been unable to break in on his transmission (on ____ kHz (or MHz)).
QSJ	What is the charge to be collected to ____ including your internal charge?	The charge to be collected to ____ including my internal charge is ____ francs.
QSK	Can you hear me between your signals and if so can I break in on your transmission?	I can hear you between my signals; break in on my transmission.
QSL	Can you acknowledge receipt?	I am acknowledging receipt.
QSM	Shall I repeat the last telegram which I sent you (or some previous telegram)?	Repeat the last telegram which you sent me (or telegram(s) number(s) ____).
QSN	Did you hear me (or ____ (call sign)) on ____ kHz (or MHz)?	I did hear you (or ____ (call sign)) on ____ kHz (or MHz).
QSO	Can you communicate with ____ direct (or by relay)?	I can communicate with ____ direct (or by relay through ____).
QSP	Will you relay to ____ free of charge?	I will relay to ____ free of charge.
QSQ	Have you a doctor on board (or is ____ (name of person) on board)?	I have a doctor on board (or ____ (name of person) is on board).
QSR	Shall I repeat the call on the calling frequency?	Repeat your call on the calling frequency; did not hear you (or have interference).
QSS	What working frequency will you use?	I will use the working frequency ____ kHz (or MHz) (in the HF bands normally only the last three figures of the frequency need be given).
QSU	Shall I send or reply on this frequency (or on ____ kHz (or MHz)) (with emissions of class ____)?	Send or reply on this frequency (or on ____ kHz (or MHz)) (with emissions of class ____).
QSV	Shall I send a series of Vs on this frequency (or on ____ kHz (or MHz))?	Send a series of Vs on this frequency (or on ____ kHz (or MHz)).
QSW	Will you send on this frequency (or on ____ kHz (or MHz)) (with emissions of class ____)?	I am going to send on this frequency (or on ____ kHz (or MHz)) (with emissions of class ____).
QSX	Will you listen to ____ (call sign(s)) on ____ kHz (or MHz)? or Will you listen to ____ (call sign(s)) on ____ kHz (or MHz), or in the bands ____ / channels ____ ?	I am listening to ____ (call sign(s)) on ____ kHz (or MHz). or I am listening to ____ (call sign(s)) on ____ kHz (or MHz), or in the bands ____ / channels ____.
QSY	Should I change to transmission on another frequency? If so what one?	Change to transmission on another frequency [or on ____ kHz (or MHz)].
QSZ	Shall I send each word or group more than once?	Send each word or group twice (or ____ times).
QTA	Shall I cancel telegram (or message) number ____ ?	Cancel telegram (or message) number ____.
QTB	Do you agree with my counting of words?	I do not agree with your counting of words; I will repeat the first letter or digit of each word or group.
QTC	How many telegrams have you to send?	I have ____ telegrams for you (or for ____).
QTD*	What has the rescue vessel or rescue aircraft recovered?	____ (identification) has recovered ____.: 1. ____ (number) survivors; 2. wreckage; 3. ____ (number) bodies
QTE	What is my TRUE bearing from you? or What is my TRUE bearing from ____ (call sign)? or What is the TRUE bearing of ____ (call sign) from ____ (call sign)?	Your TRUE bearing from me is ____ degrees at ____ hours. or Your TRUE bearing from ____ (call sign) was ____ degrees at ____ hours. or The TRUE bearing of ____ (call sign) from ____ (call sign) was ____ degrees at ____ hours.
QTF	Will you give me the position of my station according to the bearings taken by the direction-finding stations which you control?	The position of your station according to the bearings taken by the D/F stations which I control was ____ latitude, ____ longitude (or other indication of position), class ____ at ____ hours.
QTG	Will you send two dashes of ten seconds each followed by your call sign (repeated ____ times) (on ____ kHz (or MHz))? or Will you request ____ to send two dashes of ten seconds followed by his call sign (repeated ____ times) on ____ kHz (or MHz)?	I am going to send two dashes of ten seconds each followed by my call sign (repeated ____ times) (on ____ kHz (or MHz)). or I have requested ____ to send two dashes of ten seconds followed by his call sign (repeated ____ times) on ____ kHz (or MHz).
QTH	What is your position in latitude and longitude (or according to any other indication)?	My position is ____ latitude, ____ longitude (or according to any other indication).
QTI	What is your TRUE track?	My TRUE track is ____ degrees.
QTI*	What is your TRUE course?	My TRUE course is ____ degrees.
QTJ*	What is your speed? (Requests the speed of a ship or aircraft through the water or air respectively).	My speed is ____ knots (or ____ kilometres per hour or ____ statute miles per hour). (Indicates the speed of a ship or aircraft through the water or air respectively).
QTK*	What is the speed of your aircraft in relation to the surface of the Earth?	The speed of my aircraft in relation to the surface of the Earth is ____ knots (or ____ kilometres per hour or ____ statute miles per hour).
QTL*	What is your TRUE heading?	My TRUE heading is ____ degrees.
QTM*	What is your MAGNETIC heading?	My MAGNETIC heading is ____ degrees.
QTN	At what time did you depart from ____ (place)?	I departed from ____ (place) at ____ hours.
QTO	Have you left dock (or port)? or Are you airborne?	I have left dock (or port). or I am airborne.
QTP	Are you going to enter dock (or port)? or Are you going to alight (or land)?	I am going to enter dock (or port). or I am going to alight (or land).
QTQ	Can you communicate with my station by means of the International Code of Signals (INTERCO)?	I am going to communicate with your station by means of the International Code of Signals (INTERCO).
QTR	What is the correct time?	The correct time is ____ hours.
QTS	Will you send your call sign for tuning purposes or so that your frequency can be measured now (or at ____ hours) on ____ kHz (or MHz)? or Will you send your call sign (and/or name) for ____ seconds?	I will send my call sign for tuning purposes or so that my frequency may be measured now (or at ____ hours) on ____ kHz (or MHz). or I will send my call sign (and/or name) for ____ seconds.
QTT		The identification signal which follows is superimposed on another transmission.
QTU	What are the hours during which your station is open?	My station is open from ____ to ____ hours.
QTV	Shall I stand guard for you on the frequency of ____ kHz (or MHz) (from ____ to ____ hours)?	Stand guard for me on the frequency of ____ kHz (or MHz) (from ____ to ____ hours).
QTW*	What is the condition of survivors?	Survivors are in ____ condition and urgently need ____.
QTX	Will you keep your station open for further communication with me until further notice (or until ____ hours)?	I will keep my station open for further communication with you until further notice (or until ____ hours).
QTY*	Are you proceeding to the position of incident and if so when do you expect to arrive?	I am proceeding to the position of incident and expect to arrive at ____ hours (on ____ (date)).
QTZ*	Are you continuing the search?	I am continuing the search for ____ (aircraft, ship, survival craft, survivors or wreckage).
QUA	Have you news of ____ (call sign)?	Here is news of ____ (call sign).
QUB*	Can you give me in the following order information concerning: the direction in degrees TRUE and speed of the surface wind; visibility; present weather; and amount, type and height of base of cloud above surface elevation at ____ (place of observation)?	Here is the information requested: ____ (The units used for speed and distances should be indicated.)
QUC	What is the number (or other indication) of the last message you received from me (or from ____ (call sign))?	The number (or other indication) of the last message I received from you (or from ____ (call sign)) is ____.
QUD	Have you received the urgency signal sent by ____ (call sign of mobile station)?	I have received the urgency signal sent by ____ (call sign of mobile station) at ____ hours.
QUE	Can you use telephony in ____ (language), with interpreter if necessary; if so, on what frequencies? or Can you speak in ____ (language), – with interpreter if necessary; if so, on what frequencies?	I can use telephony in ____ (language) on ____ kHz (or MHz). or I can speak in ____ (language) on ____ kHz (or MHz).
QUF	Have you received the distress signal sent by ____ (call sign of mobile station)?	I have received the distress signal sent by ____ (call sign of mobile station) at ____ hours.
QUG	Will you be forced to alight (or land)?	I am forced to alight (or land) immediately. or I shall be forced to alight (or land) at ____ (position or place) at ____ hours.
QUH*	Will you give me the present barometric pressure at sea level?	The present barometric pressure at sea level is ____ (units).
QUI	Are your navigation lights working?	My navigation lights are working.
QUJ	Will you indicate the TRUE track to reach you (or ____)?	The TRUE track to reach me (or ____) is ____ degrees at ____ hours.
QUK	Can you tell me the condition of the sea observed at ____ (place or coordinates)?	The sea at ____ (place or coordinates) is ____.
QUL	Can you tell me the swell observed at ____ (place or coordinates)?	The swell at ____ (place or coordinates) is ____.
QUM	May I resume normal working?	Normal working may be resumed.
QUN	1. When directed to all stations: Will vessels (in my immediate vicinity ____) or (in the vicinity of ____ latitude, ____ longitude) or (in the vicinity of ____) please indicate their position, TRUE course, and speed? or 2. When directed to a single station: Please indicate your position, TRUE course, and speed.	My position, TRUE course and speed are ____.
QUO*	Shall I search for ____: 1. aircraft; 2. ship; 3. survival craft; in the vicinity of ____ latitude, ____ longitude (or according to any other indication)?	Please search for ____: 1. aircraft; 2. ship; 3. survival craft; in the vicinity of ____ latitude, ____ longitude (or according to any other indication).
QUP	Will you indicate your position by: 1. searchlight; 2. black smoke trail; 3. pyrotechnic lights?	My position is indicated by: 1. searchlight; 2. black smoke trail; 3. pyrotechnic lights
QUQ	Shall I train my searchlight nearly vertical on a cloud, occulting if possible and, if your aircraft is seen, deflect the beam up wind and on the water (or land) to facilitate your landing?	Please train your searchlight on a cloud, occulting if possible and, if my aircraft is seen or heard, deflect the beam up wind and on the water (or land) to facilitate my landing.
QUR*	Have survivors ____.: 1. received survival equipment; 2. been picked up by rescue vessel; 3. been reached by ground rescue party?	Survivors ____.: 1. are in possession of survival equipment; dropped by ____.: 2. have been picked up by a rescue vessel; 3. have been reached by a; ground rescue party
QUS*	Have you sighted survivors or wreckage? If so, in what position?	Have sighted ____.: 1. survivors in water; 2. survivors on rafts; 3. wreckage; at position ____ latitude, ____ longitude (or according to any other indication)
QUT*	Is position of incident marked?	Position of incident is marked by ____.: 1. flame or smoke float; 2. sea marker; 3. sea marker dye; 4. ____ (specify other marking)
QUU*	Shall I home ship or aircraft to my position?	Home ship or aircraft ____ (call sign) ____.: 1. to your position by transmitting your; call sign and long dashes on ____ kHz (or MHz): 2. by transmitting on ____ kHz (or MHz); TRUE track to reach you.
QUW*	Are you in the search area designated as ____ (designator or latitude and longitude)?	I am in the ____ (designation) search area.
QUX	Do you have any navigational warnings or gale warnings in force?	I have the following navigational warning(s) or gale warning(s) in force: ____.
QUY*	Is position of survival craft marked?	Position of survival craft was marked at ____ hours by ____.: 1. flame or smoke float; 2. sea marker; 3. sea marker dye; 4. ____ (specify other marking)
QUZ	May I resume restricted working?	Distress phase still in force; restricted working may be resumed.

=== Amateur radio ===
Amateur radio has adapted two different sets of Q-codes for use in amateur communications. The first set comes from the ITU civil series QRA through QUZ. Most of the meanings are identical to the ITU definitions; however, they must be looked at in the context of amateur communications. For example, QSJ? asks what the charges are for sending the telegraph. Since, by regulation, amateur communications are without charge, this Q-code couldn't make sense.

The second set is the set of QN Signals, used only in ARRL NTS nets. These operating signals generally have no equivalent in the ACP 131 publication or ITU publications, and are specifically defined only for use in ARRL NTS nets. They are not used in casual amateur radio communications.

Selected Q-codes were soon adopted by amateur radio operators. In December 1915, the American Radio Relay League began publication of a magazine titled QST, named after the Q-code for "General call to all stations". In amateur radio, the Q-codes were originally used in Morse code transmissions to shorten lengthy phrases and were followed by a Morse code question mark ( ▄ ▄ ▄▄▄ ▄▄▄ ▄ ▄ ) if the phrase was a question.

Q-codes are commonly used in voice communications as shorthand nouns, verbs, and adjectives making up phrases. For example, an amateur radio operator will complain about QRM (man-made interference), or tell another operator that there is "QSB on the signal" (fading); "to QSY" is to change your operating frequency, or to break in on a conversation QSK is often used even on VHF and UHF frequencies. (See also Informal usage, below.)

==== Q-codes as adapted for use in amateur radio ====
Code	Question	Answer or statement
QRA	What is the name (or call sign) of your station?	The name (or call sign) of my station is ____
QRG	Will you tell me my exact frequency (or that of ____)?	Your exact frequency (or that of ____ ) is ____ kHz (or MHz).
QRH	Does my frequency vary?	Your frequency varies.
QRI	How is the tone of my transmission?	The tone of your transmission is (1. Good; 2. Variable; 3. Bad)
QRJ	How many voice contacts do you want to make?	I want to make ____ voice contacts.
QRK	What is the readability of my signals (or those of ____)?	The readability of your signals (or those of ____) is ____ (1 to 5).
QRL	Are you busy?	I am busy (in contact with ____ ). Please do not interfere.
QRM	Do you have interference?	I have interference.
QRN	Are you troubled by static?	I am troubled by static.
QRO	Shall I increase power?	Increase power.
QRP	Shall I decrease power?	Decrease power.
QRQ	Shall I send faster?	Send faster (____ wpm).
QRS	Shall I send more slowly?	Send more slowly (____ wpm).
QRT	Shall I stop sending?	Stop sending. Often heard colloquially as: I am suspending operation / shutting off the radio.
QRU	Have you anything for me?	I have ____ messages for you.
QRV	Are you ready?	I am ready.
QRW	Shall I inform ____ that you are calling (him) on ____ kHz (or MHz)?	Please inform ____ that I am calling (him) on ____ kHz (or MHz).
QRX	Shall I standby? / When will you call me again?	Please standby / I will call you again at ____ (hours) on ____ kHz (or MHz)
QRZ	Who is calling me?	You are being called by ____ on ____ kHz (or MHz)
QSA	What is the strength of my signals (or those of ____ )?	The strength of your signals (or those of ____) is ____ (1 to 5).
QSB	Are my signals fading?	Your signals are fading.
QSD	Is my keying defective?	Your keying is defective.
QSG	Shall I send ____ telegrams (messages) at a time?	Send ____ telegrams (messages) at a time.
QSK	Can you hear me between your signals?	I can hear you between my signals.
QSL	Can you acknowledge receipt?	I will acknowledge receipt.
QSM	Shall I repeat the last telegram (message) which I sent you, or some previous telegram (message)?	Repeat the last telegram (message) which you sent me (or telegram(s) / message(s) numbers(s) ____ ).
QSN	Did you hear me (or ____ (call sign)) on ____ kHz (or MHz)?	I did hear you (or ____ (call sign)) on ____ kHz (or MHz).
QSO	Can you communicate with ____ direct or by relay?	I can communicate with ____ direct (or by relay through ____ ).
QSP	Will you relay a message to ____ ?	I will relay a message to ____ .
QSR	Do you want me to repeat my call?	Please repeat your call; I did not hear you.
QSS	What working frequency will you use?	I will use the working frequency ____ kHz (or MHz).
QST	Should I repeat the prior message to all amateurs I contact?	Here follows a broadcast message to all amateurs.
QSU	Shall I send or reply on this frequency (or on ____ kHz (or MHz))?	Send or reply on this frequency (or on ____ kHz (or MHz)).
QSW	Will you send on this frequency (or on ____ kHz (or MHz))?	I am going to send on this frequency (or on ____ kHz (or MHz)).
QSX	Will you listen to ____ (call sign(s) on ____ kHz (or MHz))?	I am listening to ____ (call sign(s) on ____ kHz (or MHz))
QSY	Shall I change to transmission on another frequency?	Change to transmission on another frequency (or on ____ kHz (or MHz)).
QSZ	Shall I send each word or group more than once?	Send each word or group twice (or ____ times).
QTA	Shall I cancel telegram (message) number ____ as if it had not been sent?	Cancel telegram (message) number ____ as if it had not been sent.
QTC	How many telegrams (messages) have you to send?	I have ____ telegrams (messages) for you (or for ____ ).
QTH	What is your position in latitude and longitude? (or according to any other indication)	My position is ____ latitude ____ longitude.
QTR	What is the correct time?	The correct time is ____ hours UTC.
QTU	At what times are you operating?	I am operating from ____ to ____ hours.
QTX	Will you keep your station open for further communication with me until further notice (or until ____ hours)?	I will keep my station open for further communication with you until further notice (or until ____ hours).
QUA	Have you news of ____ (call sign)?	Here is news of ____ (call sign).
QUC	What is the number (or other indication) of the last message you received from me (or from ____ (call sign))?	The number (or other indication) of the last message I received from you (or from ____ (call sign)) is ____.
QUD	Have you received the urgency signal sent by ____ (call sign of mobile station)?	I have received the urgency signal sent by ____ (call sign of mobile station) at ____ hours.
QUE	Can you speak in ____ (language) – with interpreter if necessary – if so, on what frequencies?	I can speak in ____ (language) on ____ kHz (or MHz).
QUF	Have you received the distress signal sent by ____ (call sign of mobile station)?	I have received the distress signal sent by ____ (call sign of mobile station) at ____ hours.

==== Notes for response to radiotelegraph Q-codes ====
Responses to a radiotelegraph Q-code query or a Q-code assertion may vary depending upon the code. For Q-code assertions or queries which only need to be acknowledged as received, the usual practice is to respond with the letter "R" for "Roger" which means "Received correctly". Sending an "R" merely means the code has been correctly received and does not necessarily mean that the receiving operator has taken any other action.

For Q-code queries that need to be answered in the affirmative, the usual practice is to respond with the letter "C" (Sounds like the Spanish word "Si"). For Q-code queries that need to be answered in the negative, the usual practice is to respond with the letter "N" for "no". For those Q-code assertions that merely need to be acknowledged as understood, the usual practice is to respond with the prosign S̅N̅ (or V̅E̅) which means "understood". On telegraph cable networks "KK" was often used at the end of a reply to a Q-code to mean "OK" or "Acknowledged". This practice predates amateur radio as telegraph operators in the late 19th century are known to have used it.

==== Informal usage ====
Chart of the Morse code letters and numerals.

QAC - Taken from the Articles of Association of the South Hampshire International Telegraphy Society, para 9: "...and amongst themselves they shall promote the Use of the Code QAC, which shall be taken as implying "All Compliments" and shall include:- VY 73 73 OM CUL BCNU & mni tnx fer nice/FB/rotten QSO GL GB hpe cuagn wid gud/btr/wrse condx mri Xms Hpi Nw Yr mni hpi rtrns gtgs fer Rosh Hoshanah/Id el Fitr/May Day/Tksgvg 88 to XYL/YL/Widow Ciao Cheerio & gud/FB/best DX or any Part or Parts thereof in any Permutation or Combination.

QLF – "Are you sending with your left foot? Try sending with your left foot!" A humorously derogatory comment about the quality of a person's sending.

QNB – QNB? “How many buttons on your radio?” “QNB 100/5” Means there are 100 and I know what 5 of them do.

QSK – "I can hear you during my transmission" – refers to a particular mode of Morse code operating often called QSK operation (full break-in) in which the receiver is quickly enabled during the spaces between the dits and dahs, which allows another operator to interrupt transmissions. Many modern transceivers incorporate this function, sometimes referred to as full break-in as against semi-break-in in which there is a short delay before the transceiver goes to receive.

QSY – "Change to transmission on another frequency"; colloquially, "move [=change address]". E.g., "When did GKB QSY from Northolt to Portishead?"

QTH – "My location is ____"; colloquially in voice or writing, "location". E.g., "The OCF [antenna type] is an interesting build but at my QTH a disappointing performer."

QTHR – "At the registered location ____"; chiefly British use. Historically, the location in the printed Callbook; modernly, "as given in online government records for my callsign". E.g., "You can contact me QTHR".

QBL – “Quit Being a Lid”. QBL is used among amateur radio operators to indicate humor in their CW transmission. While QBL is generally used by a small subsection of operators who can properly decode, it is available to anyone. "Lid" is said to be short for "Literal Idiot". The QBL moniker has been adopted by some radio operators as a term of endearment, like the QBL Radio Club.

==== German use during World War II ====
During World War II, according to Bletchley Park’s General Report on Tunny, German radio teleprinter networks used Q-codes to establish and maintain circuit connections.

In particular: QEP was to indicate the Lorenz cipher machine setting for each message and, QZZ to indicate that the daily key change was about to take place at the sender's station.

== See also ==
- ACP-131 – Defines Allied Military brevity codes
- Amateur radio – Non-commercial use of the radio spectrum
- Brevity code – Radio and telegraph signals encoding longer definitions
- International Code of Signals – Maritime communication method
- International maritime signal flags – Flags used for naval communication
- Morse code – Transmission of language with brief pulses
- NOTAM Code – Brevity code for international aviation
- Prosigns for Morse code – Predefined shorthand signals
- QRA locator – Obsolete geographic coordination system
- QSK operation (full break-in) – Morse code operating mode
- Ten-code – Brevity codes used by a variety of US professionals
- Z code – Morse code operating signal of the US Army / NATO
