= Automated airport weather station =

Automated sensor suites

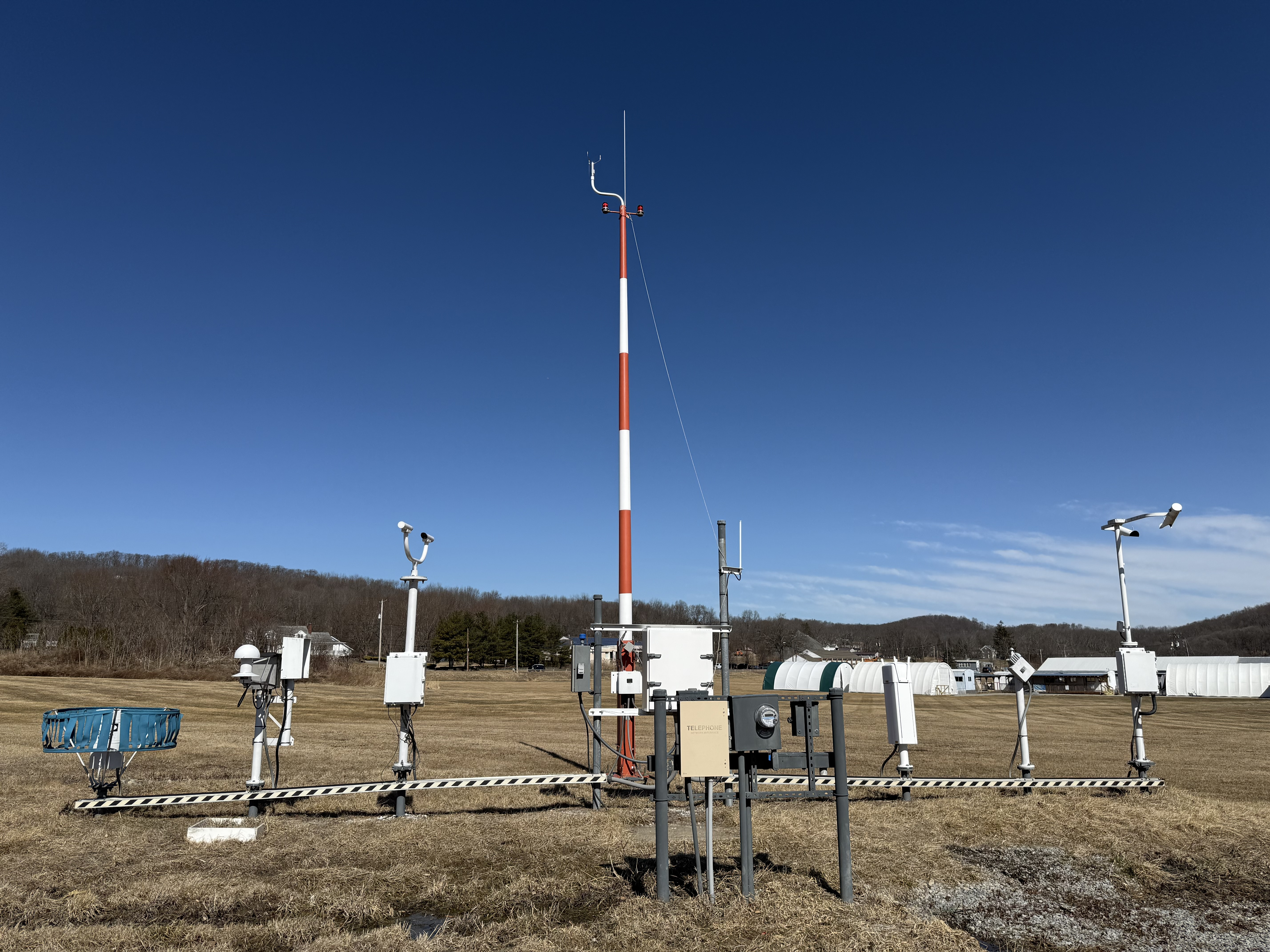
An ASOS data collection platform

Airport weather stations are automated sensor suites which are designed to serve aviation and meteorological operations, weather forecasting and climatology. Automated airport weather stations have become part of the backbone of weather observing in the United States and Canada and are becoming increasingly more prevalent worldwide due to their efficiency and cost-savings.

== System types within the United States ==
In the United States, there are several varieties of automated weather stations that have somewhat subtle but important differences. These include the automated weather observing system (AWOS) and the automated surface observing system (ASOS).

Summary of Weather Observing Programs
Element Reported	Wind	Visibility	Temperature & Dew Point	Altimeter	Density Altimeter	Cloud / Ceiling	Precipitation Identification	Thunderstorm / Lightning	Precipitation Occurrence	Rainfall Accumulation	Runway Surface Condition	Freezing Rain Occurrence	Remarks
ASOS	Yes	Yes	Yes	Yes	Yes	Yes	Yes	Yes	Yes	Yes		Yes	Yes
AWOS-A				Yes									
AWOS-A/V		Yes		Yes									
AWOS-1	Yes		Yes	Yes	Yes								
AWOS-2	Yes	Yes	Yes	Yes	Yes								
AWOS-3	Yes	Yes	Yes	Yes	Yes	Yes							
AWOS-3P	Yes	Yes	Yes	Yes	Yes	Yes	Yes						
AWOS-3T	Yes	Yes	Yes	Yes	Yes	Yes		Yes					
AWOS-3P/T	Yes	Yes	Yes	Yes	Yes	Yes	Yes	Yes					
AWOS-4	Yes	Yes	Yes	Yes	Yes	Yes	Yes	Yes	Yes	Yes	Yes	Yes	
Manual	Yes	Yes	Yes	Yes		Yes	Yes						Yes

=== Automated weather observing system (AWOS) ===
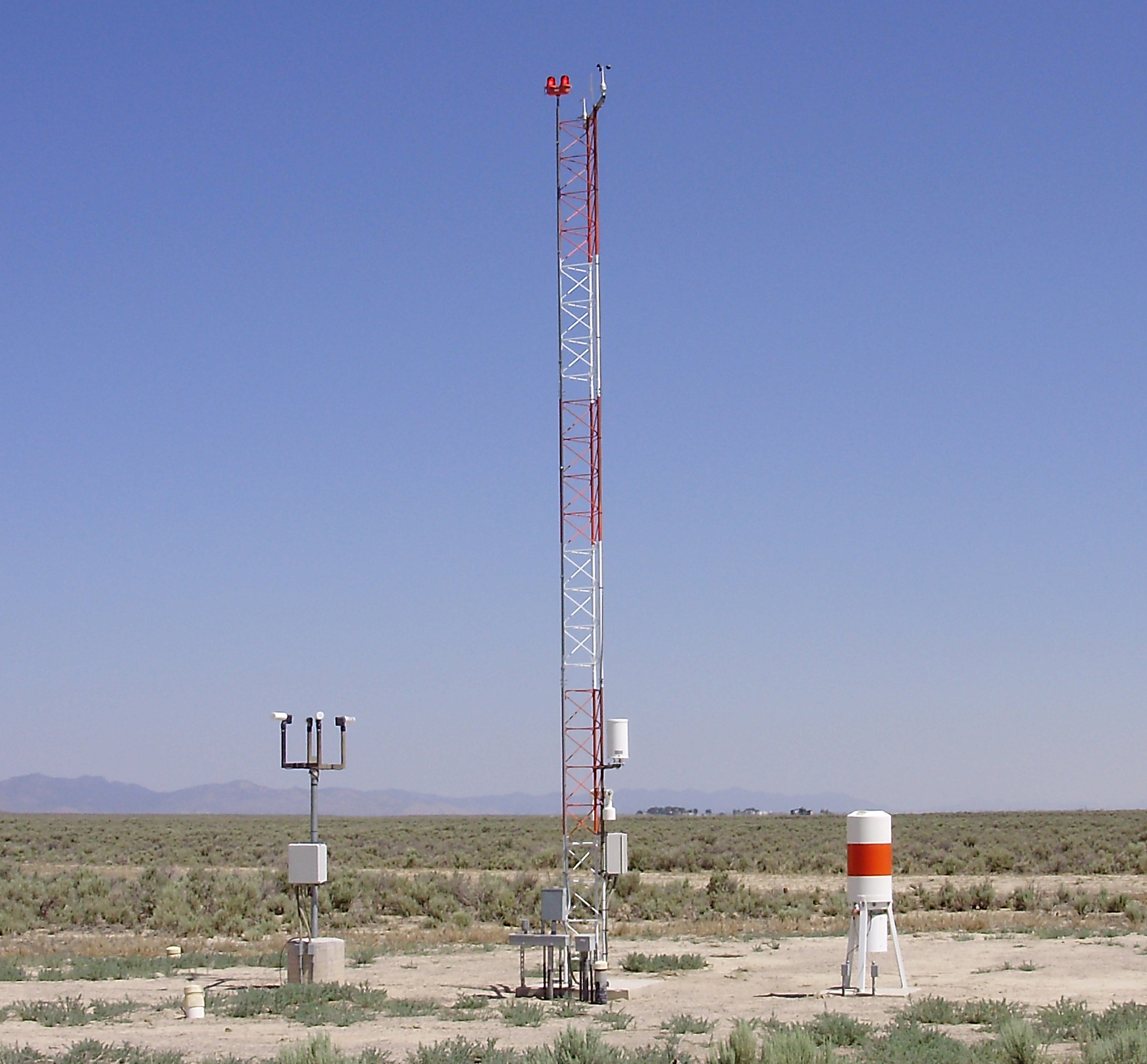
A commercial AWOS

The automated weather observing system (AWOS) units are mostly operated, maintained and controlled by state or local governments and other non-federal entities and are certified under the FAA non-federal AWOS Program. The FAA completed an upgrade of the 230 FAA owned AWOS and former automated weather sensor systems (AWSS) systems to the AWOS-C configuration in 2017. The AWOS-C is the most up-to-date FAA owned AWOS facility and can generate METAR/SPECI formatted aviation weather reports. The AWOS-C is functionally equivalent to the ASOS. FAA owned AWOS-C units in Alaska are typically classified as AWOS-C IIIP units while all other AWOS-C units are typically classified as AWOS III P/T units.

AWOS systems disseminate weather data in a variety of ways:

- A computer-generated voice message which is broadcast via radio frequency to pilots in the vicinity of an airport. The message is updated at least once per minute, and this is the only mandatory form of weather reporting for an AWOS.
- Optionally, a computer-generated voice message, available over a telephone dial-up modem service. The message is updated at least once per minute.
- Optionally (but frequently done), AWOS messages may be transmitted to the FAA for national dissemination via computer. These messages are currently in METAR format, and typical reporting frequencies are once every 20 minutes. This option is only available for AWOS III or IV systems (see below).

The following AWOS configurations are defined below in terms of what parameters they measure:

- AWOS A: barometric pressure and altimeter setting (in inches of Mercury).
- AWOS I: wind speed and wind gusts (in knots), wind direction (from which the wind is blowing) and variable wind direction (in degrees of the compass), temperature and dew point (in degrees Celsius), altimeter setting and density altitude.
- AWOS II: all AWOS I parameters, plus visibility and variable visibility (in miles).
- AWOS III: all AWOS II parameters, plus sky condition (in oktas), cloud ceiling height (in feet), and liquid precipitation accumulation (in inches).
- AWOS III P: all AWOS III parameters, plus precipitation type (rain, snow and sometimes drizzle) identification.
- AWOS III T: all AWOS III parameters, plus thunderstorm detection (via a cloud-to-ground lightning detector).
- AWOS III P/T: all AWOS III parameters, plus precipitation type identification and thunderstorm detection.
- AWOS IV Z: all AWOS III P/T parameters, plus freezing rain detection via a freezing rain sensor (Note: this configuration used to be called AWOS III PTZ).
- AWOS IV R: all AWOS III P/T parameters, plus runway surface condition.
- AWOS IV Z/R: all AWOS III P/T parameters, plus freezing rain detection and runway surface condition.

Also, custom configurations such as AWOS AV (AWOS A parameters plus visibility) are possible. Non-certified sensors may be attached to AWOS systems, but weather data derived from those sensors must be clearly identified as "advisory" in any voice messages and may not be included in any METAR observations.

As of May 22, 2022, the following manufacturers provide FAA-certified, non-federal AWOS systems:

- All Weather Inc. (An ADB SAFEGATE Company)
- DBT Transportation Services LLC (An ADB SAFEGATE Company)
- Mesotech International, Inc.
- Optical Scientific Inc.

=== Automated surface observing system (ASOS) ===
The automated surface observing system (ASOS) units are operated and controlled cooperatively in the United States by the NWS, FAA, and DOD. After many years of research and development, the deployment of ASOS units began in 1991 and was completed in 2004.

These systems generally report at hourly intervals, but also report special observations if weather conditions change rapidly and cross aviation operation thresholds. They generally report all the parameters of the AWOS-III, while also having the additional capabilities of reporting temperature and dew point in degrees Fahrenheit, present weather, icing, lightning, sea level pressure and precipitation accumulation.

Besides serving aviation needs, ASOS serves as a primary climatological observing network in the United States, making up the first-order network of climate stations. Because of this, not every ASOS is located at an airport; for example, one of these units is located at Belvedere Castle in Central Park, New York City; another is located at the Blue Hill Observatory near Boston, Massachusetts.

=== Automated weather sensor system (AWSS) ===
The FAA has converted all automated weather sensor system (AWSS) units to AWOS III P/T units. There are no AWSS systems remaining in the US National Airspace System (NAS).

== Observing equipment ==
Automated airport weather stations use a variety of sophisticated equipment to observe the weather.

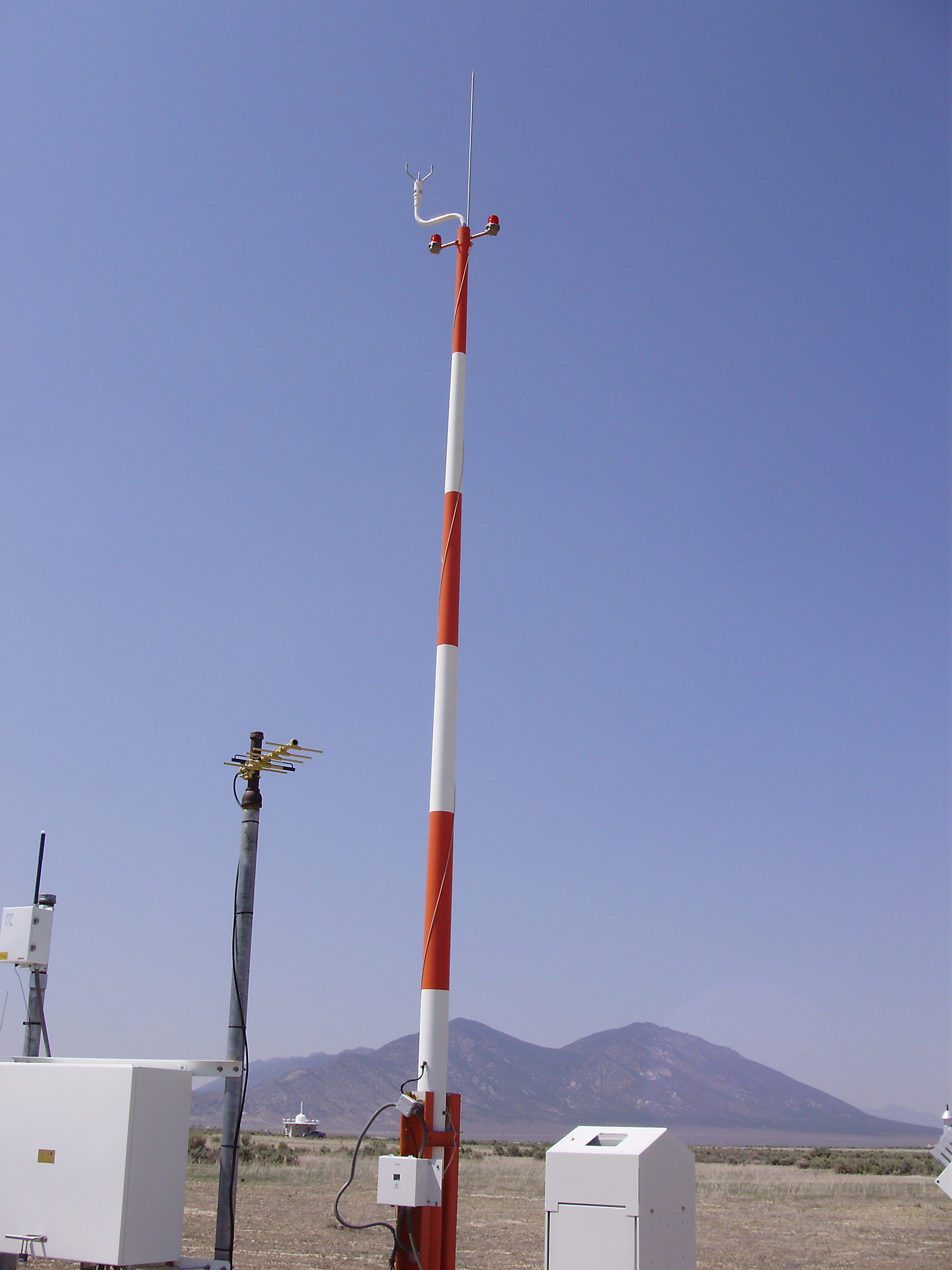
ASOS ice-free wind sensor

=== Wind speed and direction ===
A majority of older automated airport weather stations are equipped with a mechanical wind vane and cup system to measure wind speed and direction. This system is simple in design: the wind spins three horizontally turned cups around the base of the wind vane, providing an estimation of the wind's speed, while the vane on top turns so that the face of the vane offers the least resistance to the wind, causing it to point in the direction the wind is coming from and thus providing the wind direction.

The new generation of sensors use sound waves to measure wind speed and direction. The measurement is based on the time it takes for an ultrasonic pulse to travel from one transducer to another, which varies depending on - among other factors - the wind speed. The transit time is measured in both directions for several (usually two or three) pairs of the transducer heads. Based on those results, the sensor computes wind speed and direction. Compared to mechanical sensors, the ultrasonic sensors offer several advantages such as no moving parts, advanced self-diagnostic capabilities and reduced maintenance requirements.

NWS and FAA ASOS stations and most of new AWOS installations are currently equipped with ultrasonic wind sensors.

Unlike all other measurements, which are made between 3 and 9 feet (0.91 and 2.74 meters) above the ground, wind speed and direction are measured at 30 feet (9.1 meters).

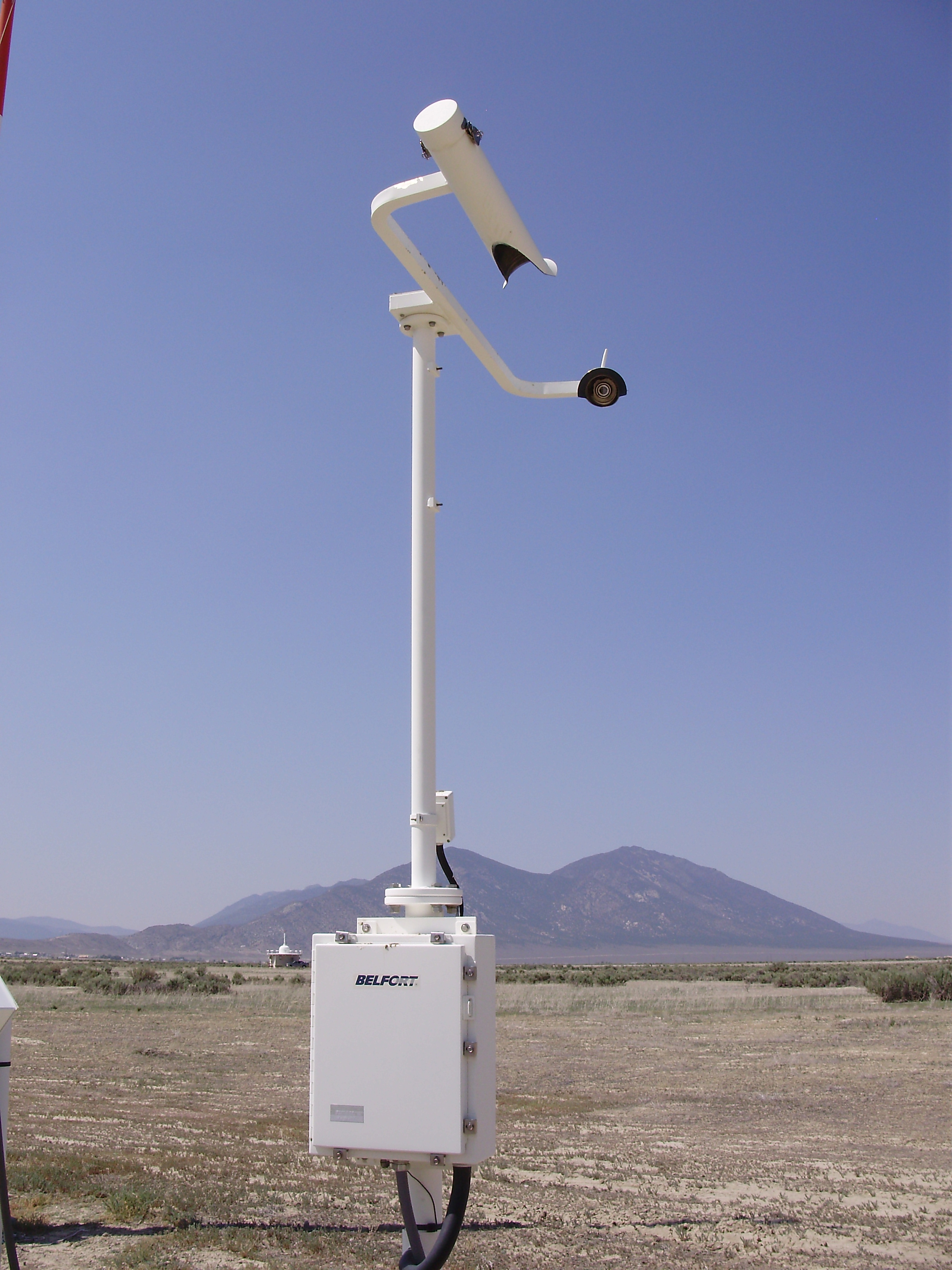
ASOS visibility sensor

=== Visibility ===
To determine visibility, automated airport weather stations use one of two sensor types:

- forward scatter sensors
- transmissometers

The forward scatter sensor uses a beam of infrared light which is sent from one end of the sensor toward the receiver, but offset from a direct line to the receiver by a certain angle. The amount of light scattered by particles in the air and received by the receiver determines the extinction coefficient. This is then converted to visibility using either Allard's or Koschmieder's law.

In a transmissometer, a beam of visible light is transmitted from its transmitter to receiver head. The extinction coefficient is derived from the amount of light lost in the air.

There also are sensors that, to a certain degree combine a transmissometer with a forward scatter sensor.

Forward scatter sensors are more popular due to their lower price, smaller size and lower maintenance requirements. However, transmissometers are still used at some airports as they are more accurate at low visibilities and are fail-safe, i.e. in case of failure report visibility lower than actual.

Current sensors are capable of reporting visibility in a wide range. For aviation purposes, the reported values are rounded down to the nearest step in one of the following scales:

- M1/4 (less than 1/4 mile), 1/4, 1/2, 3/4, 1, 1-1/4, 1-1/2, 2, 2-1/2, 3, 4, 5, 7, 10 and 10+ (greater than 10 miles)
- In steps of 50 m when the visibility is less than 800 m; in steps of 100 m when it is 800 m or more, but less than 5 km; in kilometer steps when the visibility is 5 km or more but less than 10 km; and 10 km when visibility is 10 km or more.

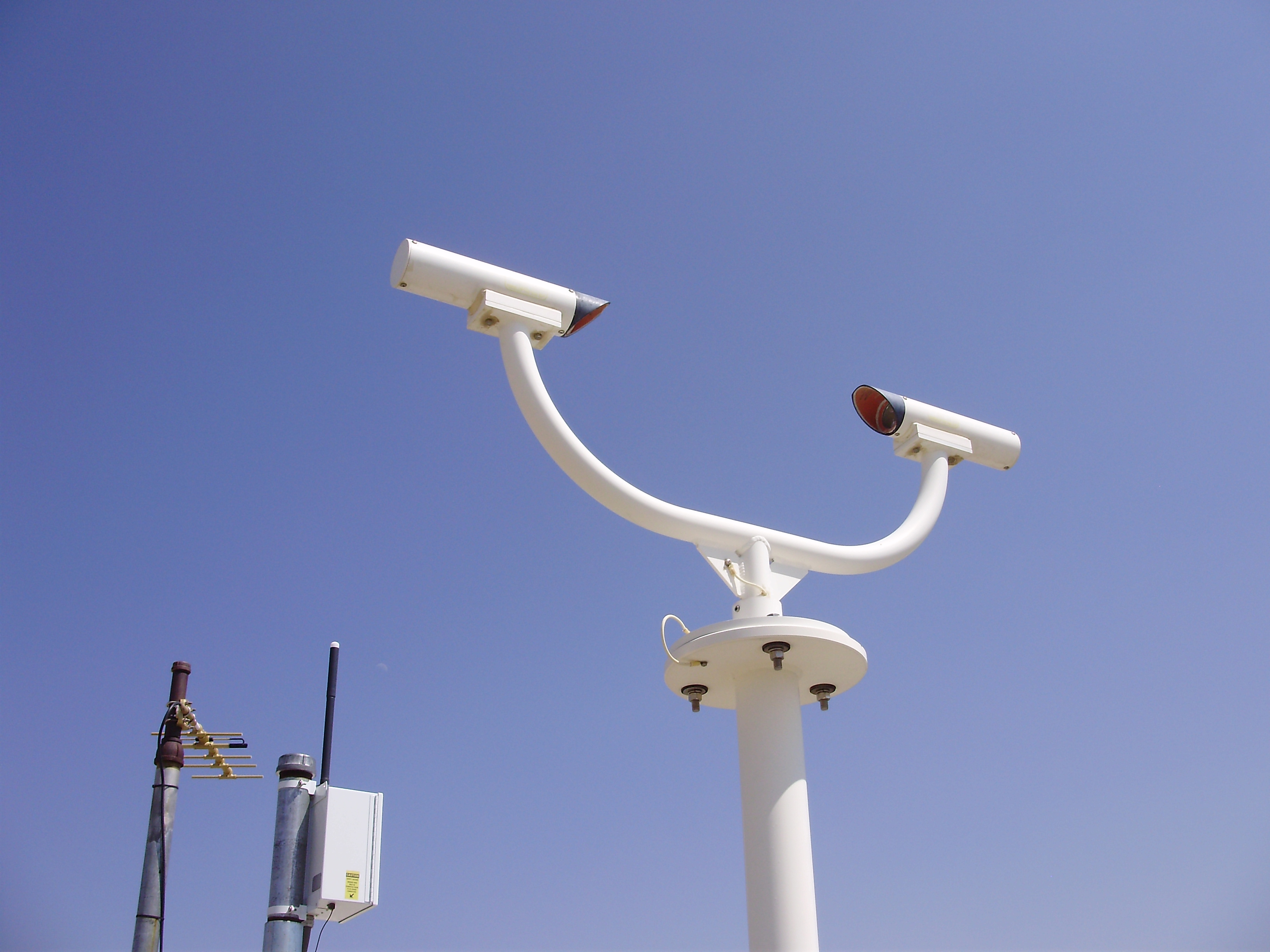
ASOS present weather sensor

=== Present weather (falling precipitation) ===
Automated airport weather stations use a light emitting diode weather identifier (LEDWI) to determine if and what type of precipitation is falling. The LEDWI sensor measures the scintillation pattern of the precipitation falling through the sensor's infrared beam (approximately 50 millimeters in diameter) and determines from a pattern analysis of the particle size and fall velocity whether the precipitation is rain or snow. If precipitation is determined to be falling, but the pattern is not conclusively identified as either rain or snow, unknown precipitation is reported. Automated airport weather stations are not yet able to report hail, ice pellets, and various other intermediate forms of precipitation.

=== Obscurations to vision ===
Automated airport weather stations do not have a separate sensor for detecting specific obscurations to vision. Instead, when visibility is reduced below 7 statute miles, the system uses the reported temperature and dew point to determine an obscuration to vision. If relative humidity is low (i.e., there is a large difference between the temperature and dew point), haze is reported. If relative humidity is high (i.e., there is a small difference between the temperature and the dew point), mist or fog is reported, depending on the exact visibility. Fog is reported when visibility is 1/2 mile or less; mist is reported for visibilities greater than 0.5 miles (0.80 km) but less than 7 miles (11 km). If the temperature is below freezing, humidity is high and visibility is 1/2 mile or less, freezing fog is reported.

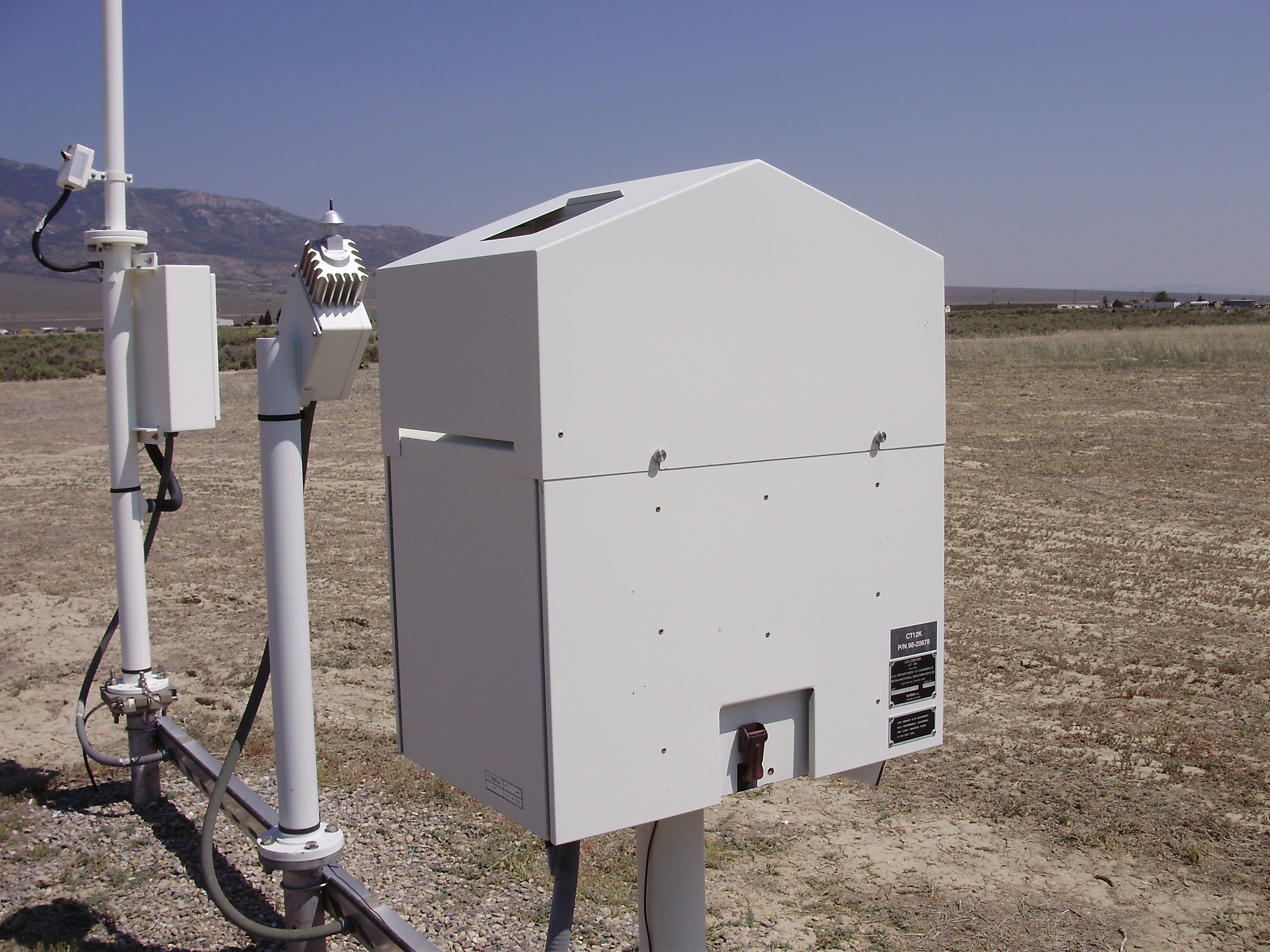
ASOS CT12K ceilometer

=== Cloud coverage and ceiling ===
Automated airport weather stations use an upward-pointing laser beam ceilometer to detect the amount and height of clouds. The laser is pointed upward, and the time required for reflected light to return to the station allows for the calculation of the height of the cloud base. Because of the limited coverage area (the laser can only detect clouds directly overhead), the system computer calculates a time-averaged cloud cover and ceiling, which is reported to external users. To compensate for the danger of rapidly changing sky cover, the averaging is weighted toward the first 10 minutes of the 30-minute averaging period. The range of the ceilometer is up to 25,000 feet (7,600 m) depending on the model. Clouds above that height are not detectable by automated stations at present.

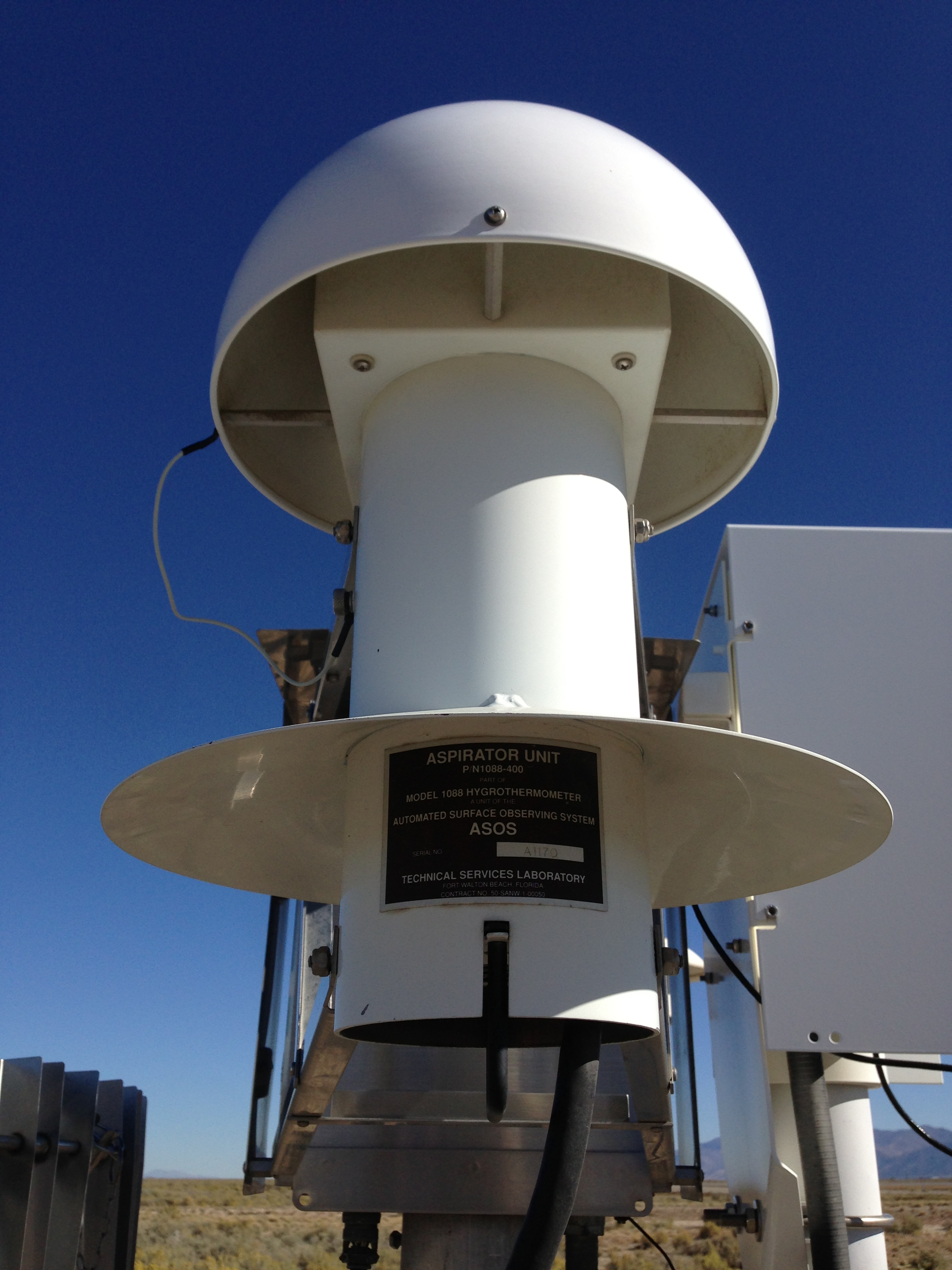
ASOS HO-1088 thermometer

=== Temperature and dew point ===
Automated airport weather stations use a temperature/dew point sensor (hygrothermometer) designed for continuous operation which normally remains on at all times, except during maintenance.

The measurement of temperature is simple compared to the dew point. Operating under the principle that electrical resistance varies with temperature, a platinum wire resistive temperature device measures the ambient air temperature. The current ASOS thermometer is designated the HO-1088, though some older systems still utilize the HO-83.

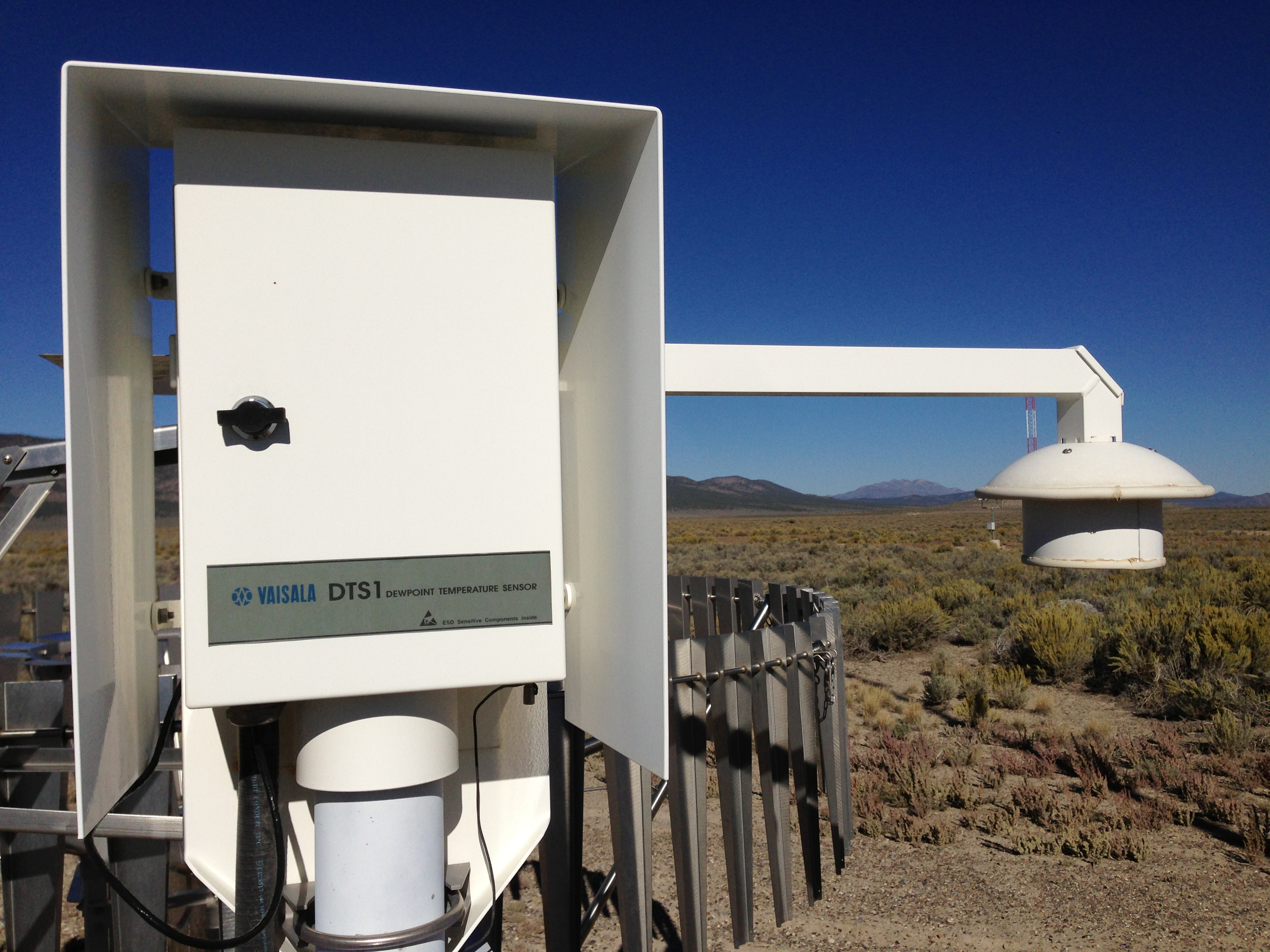
ASOS DTS-1 dew point sensor

In contrast, the dew point measurement is considerably more complex. The original dew point sensor deployed on ASOS systems utilized a chilled mirror that is cooled to the point where a fine film of condensation forms on the mirror's surface. The temperature of the mirror at this condition is equal to the dew point temperature. The hygrometer measures the dew point by directing a light beam from a small infrared diode to the surface of the mirror at an angle of 45 degrees. Two photo transistors are mounted so they measure a high degree of reflected light when the mirror is clear (direct) and scattered light when the mirror is clouded with visible condensation (indirect). With the formation of condensation on the mirror, the degree of cloudiness of the mirror surface increases with the direct transistor receiving less light and the indirect transistor more light. The output from these photo transistors controls the mirror cooling module which is an electronic heat pump that operates much like a thermocouple in reverse, producing a heating or cooling effect. When the sensor is first activated, the mirror is clear. As the mirror surface temperature is cooled to the dew point temperature, condensations forms on the mirror. The electronics continuously tries to stabilize the signal levels to the power amplifier to maintain the mirror temperature at the dew point. If the dew point of the air changes or if the circuit is disturbed by noise, the loop makes the necessary corrections to restabilize at the dew point and maintaining continuous operation.

Due to problems with the chilled mirror sensor, NWS ASOS sites now use Vaisala's DTS1 sensor, which measures humidity only via capacitance. The sensor is based on a solid state capacitive relative humidity element that incorporates a small heater so that the sensing element is always above the ambient temperature, eliminating the formation of dew or frost. The sensor reports directly in dew point through a calculation based on measured relative humidity and the measured temperature of the heated capacitive element.

Older AWOS systems used a lithium chloride dew point sensor. Current AWOS systems use capacitive relative humidity sensors, from which dew point is calculated.

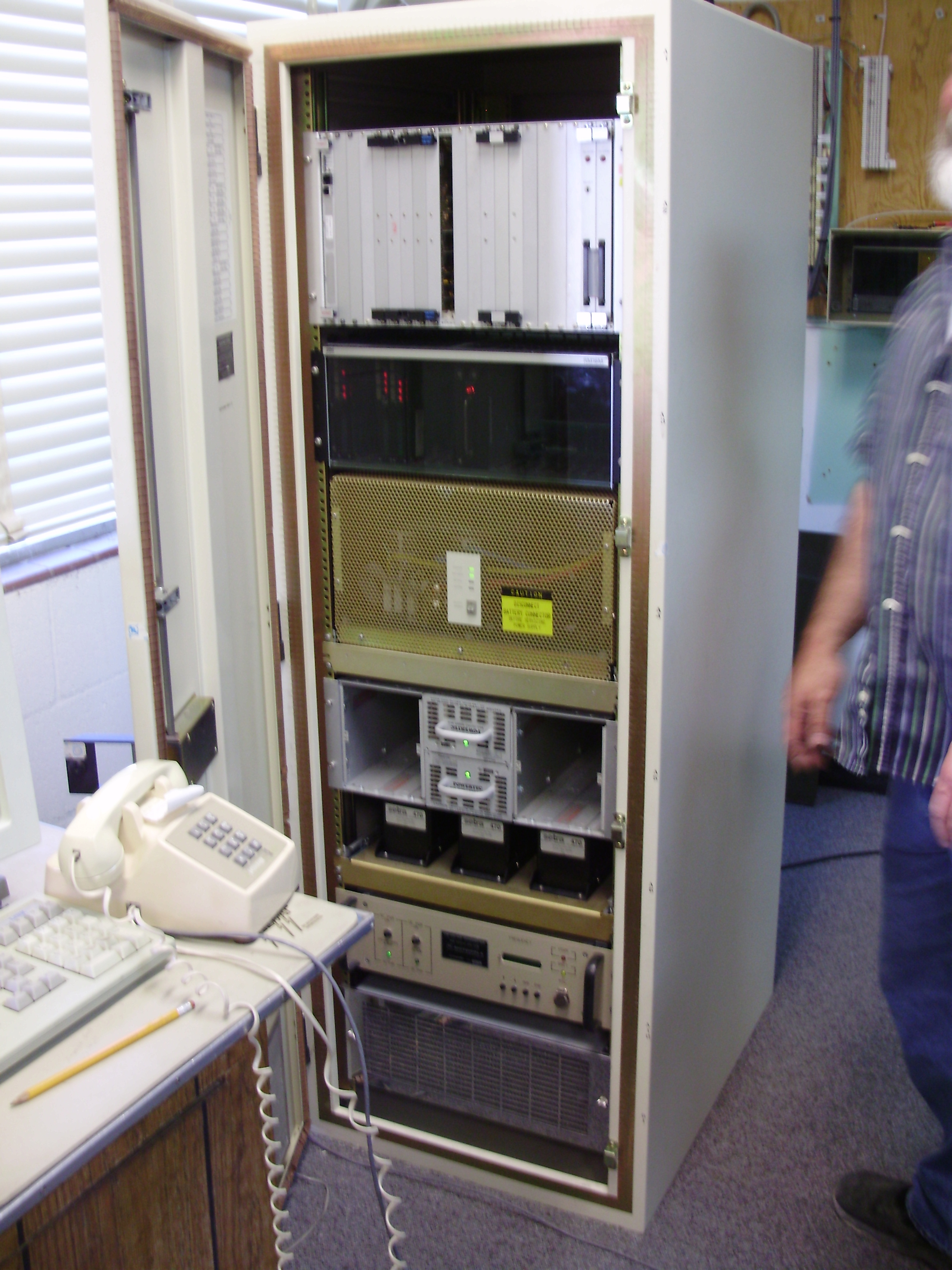
ASOS acquisition control unit, including the three pressure transducers towards the bottom

=== Barometric pressure and altimeter setting ===
Data from a barometric pressure sensor are used to calculate QNH altimeter setting. Pilots rely on this value to determine their altitude. To ensure safe separation from terrain and other obstructions, high degree of accuracy and reliability is required from a pressure sensor.

Most aviation weather stations use two (required for an AWOS) or three independent pressure transducers. The transducers may or may not share their associated tubing and external ports (designed to minimize effect of wind/wind gusts). Should the reported pressures differ by more than a preset maximum, the pressure values are discarded and altimeter setting is not reported or is reported as "missing."

Altimeter setting is calculated based on barometric pressure, site elevation, sensor elevation and - optionally - air temperature.

Altimeter setting is reported in inches of mercury (in steps of 0.01 inHg) or whole hectopascals, rounded down.

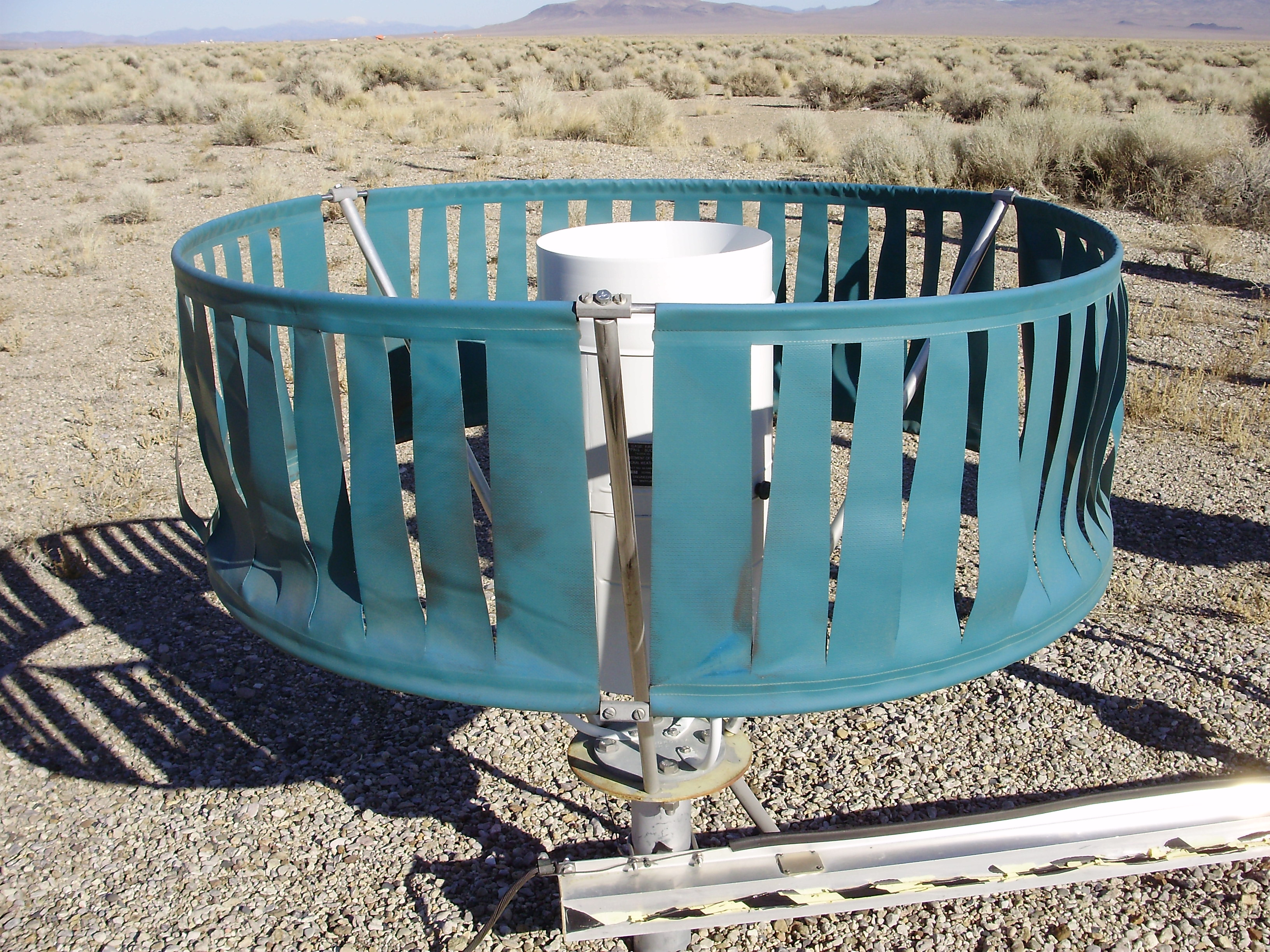
ASOS heated tipping bucket precipitation gauge

=== Precipitation accumulation ===
The original precipitation accumulation measuring device used for automated airport weather stations was the heated tipping bucket rain gauge. The upper portion of this device consists of a 1-foot (0.30 m) diameter collector with an open top. The collector, which is heated to melt any frozen precipitation such as snow or hail, funnels water into a two-chamber, pivoting container called a bucket. Precipitation flows through the funnel into one compartment of the bucket until 0.01-inch (0.25 mm) of water (18.5 grams) is accumulated. That amount of weight causes the bucket to tip on its pivots, dumping the collected water and moving the other chamber under the funnel. The tipping motion activates a switch (either a reed switch or a mercury switch), which sends one electrical pulse for each 0.01-inch (0.25 mm) of precipitation collected.

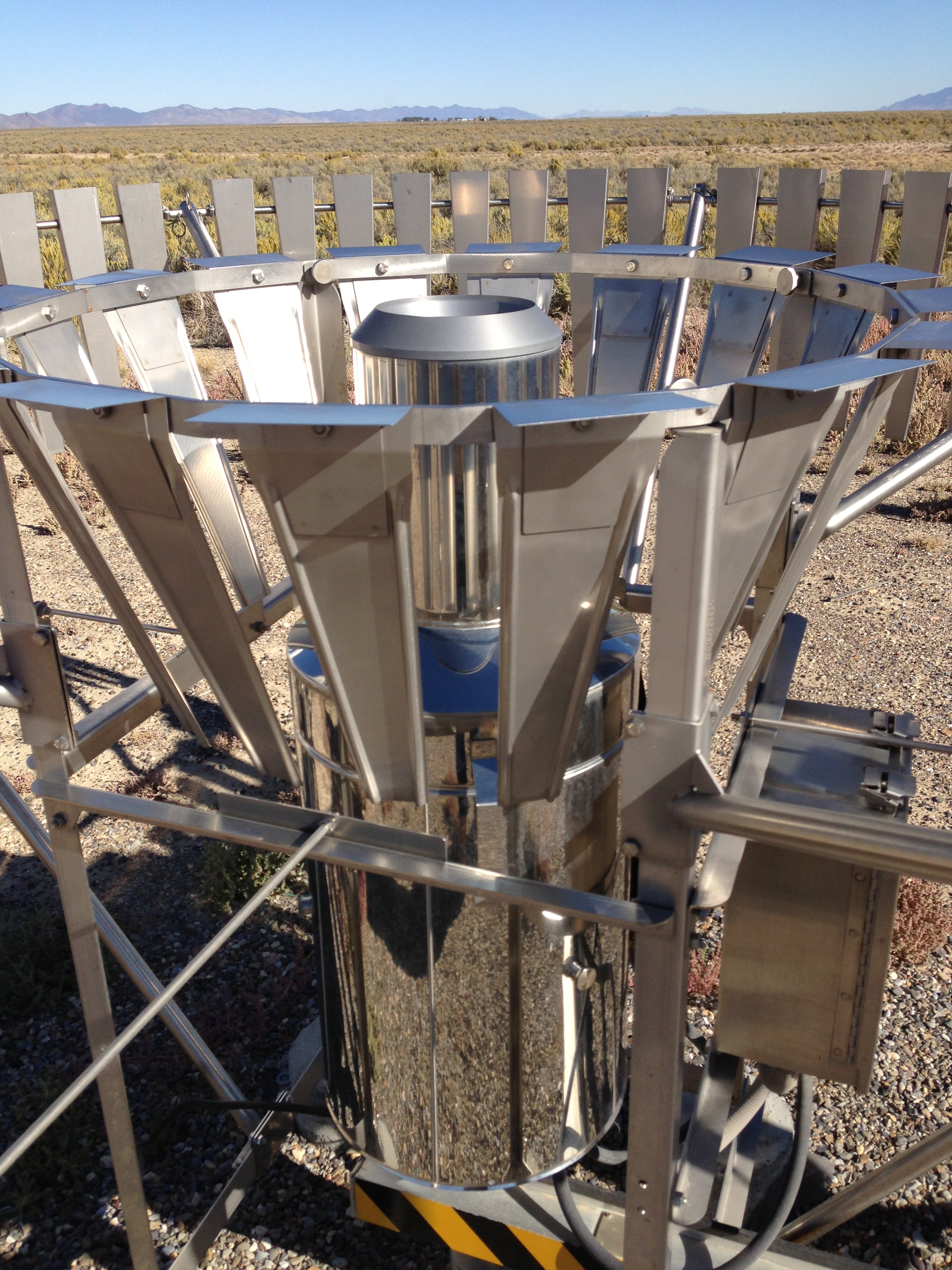
ASOS all-weather precipitation accumulation gauge (AWPAG)

Because of problems the heated tipping bucket has with properly measuring frozen precipitation (particularly snow), the all-weather precipitation accumulation gauge (AWPAG) was developed. This sensor is essentially a weighing gauge where precipitation continuously accumulates within the collector, and as the weight increases, precipitation is recorded. Only select NWS ASOS units have been equipped with the AWPAG.

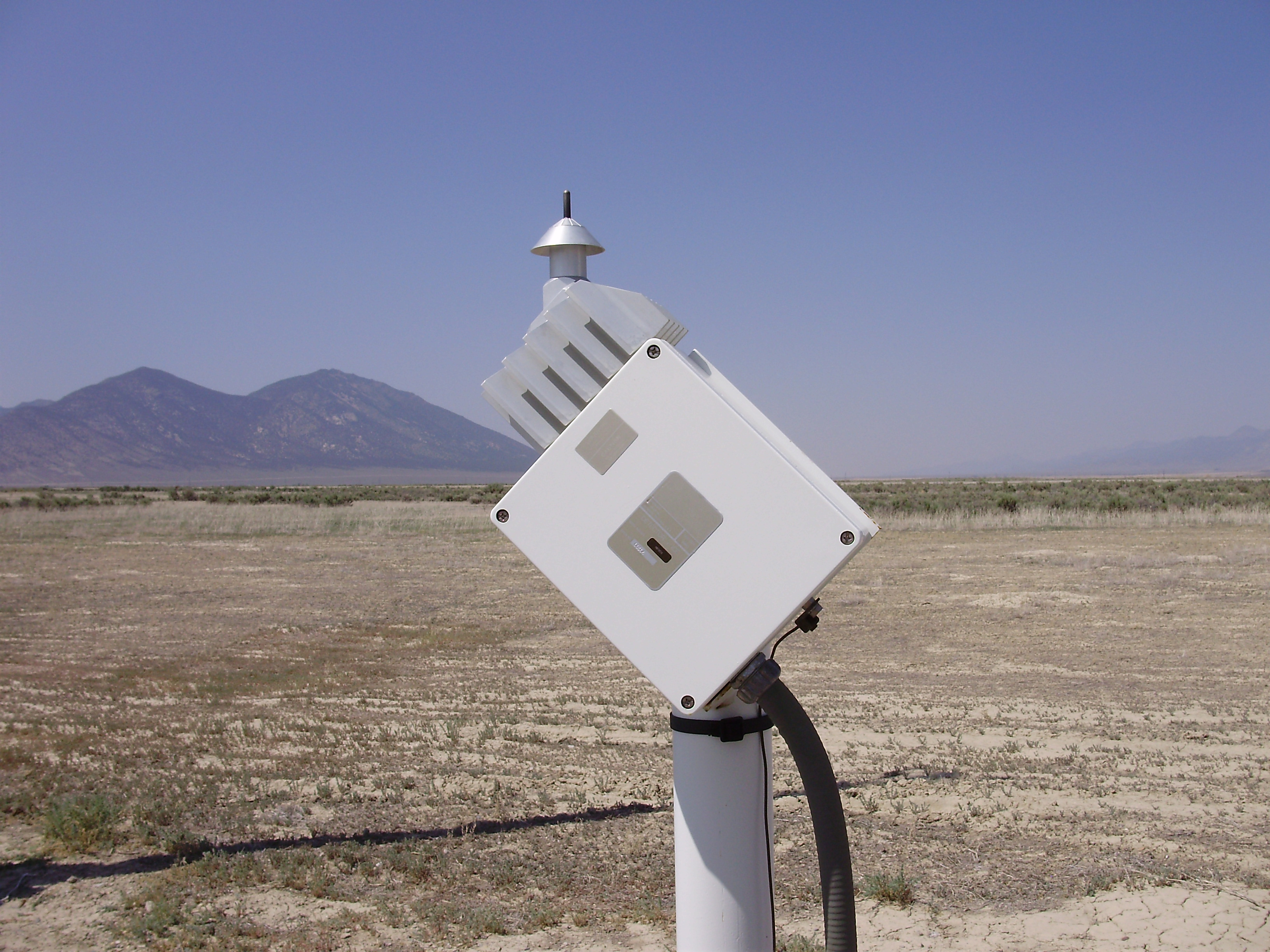
ASOS freezing rain sensor

=== Icing (freezing rain) ===
Automated airport weather stations report freezing rain via the resonant frequency of a vibrating rod. The resonant frequency decreases with increasing accretion (additional mass) of ice, hoarfrost, freezing fog, freezing drizzle, rime, or wet snow.

To report freezing rain, the system combines the sensor output from the freezing rain sensor with data from the LEDWI. The LEDWI must provide a positive indication of unknown precipitation or rain before the system can transmit a report of freezing rain. If the LEDWI reports either no precipitation or snow, the system will ignore the input from the freezing rain sensor. The sensor is designed to detect and report icing from all weather conditions.

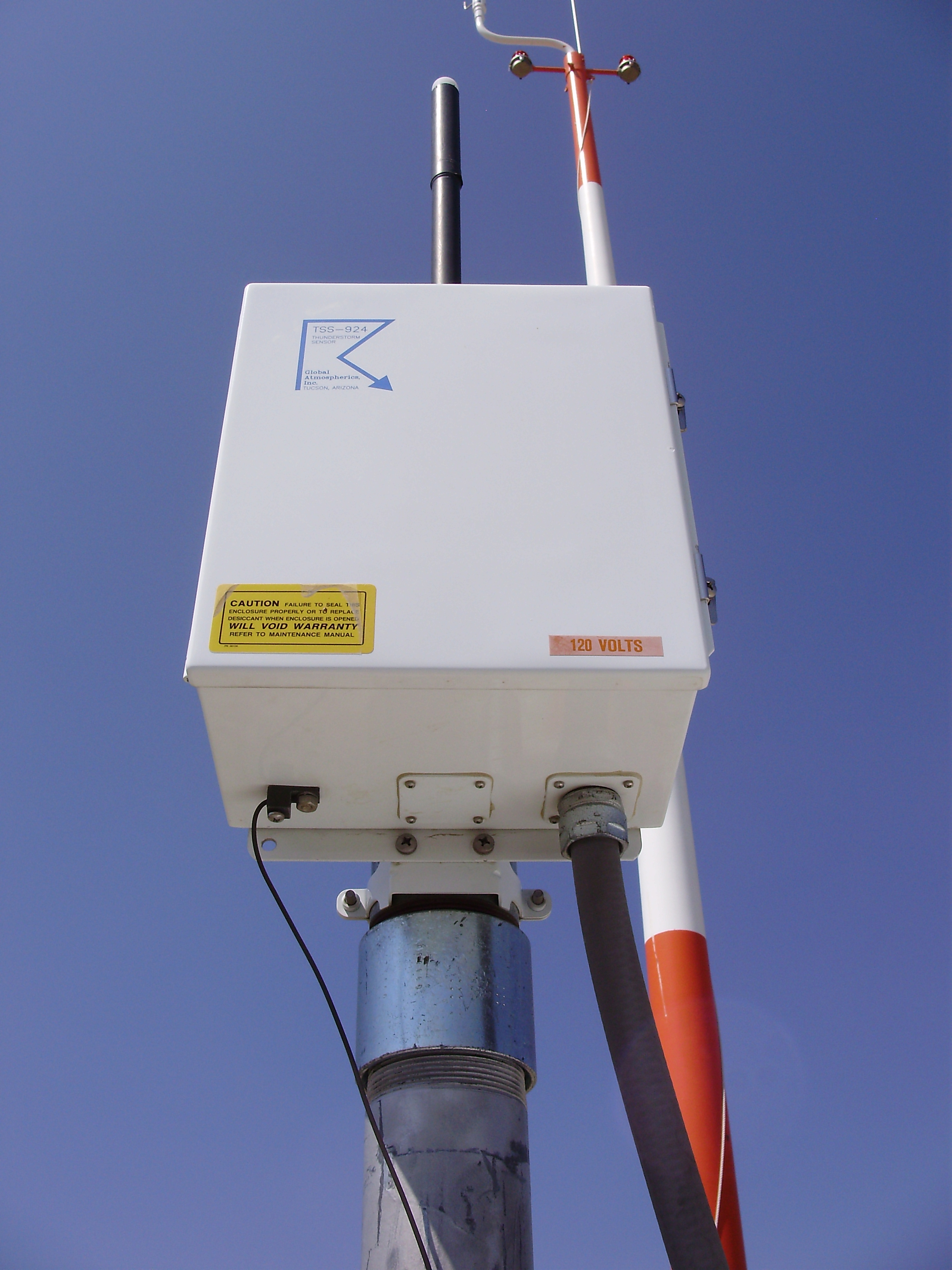
ASOS thunderstorm sensor

=== Lightning (thunderstorms) ===
Many automated airport weather stations within the United States use the National Lightning Detection Network (NLDN) to detect lightning via the automatic lightning detection and reporting system (ALDARS). The NLDN uses 106 sensors nationwide to triangulate lightning strikes. Data from the detection grid is fed into ALDARS, which in turn sends messages to each automated airport station informing it of the proximity of any lightning strikes. Lightning strikes within 5 miles (8.0 km) of the station result in a report of a thunderstorm at the station (TS). Lightning strikes more than 5 miles (8.0 km) but less than 10 miles (16 km) from the station result in a report of a thunderstorm in the vicinity of the station (VCTS). Lightning more than 10 miles (16 km) but less than 30 miles (48 km) from the station results only in a remark of distant lightning (LTG DSNT).

However, some stations now have their own lightning sensor to actually measure lightning strikes at the site rather than requiring an external service. This thunderstorm sensor works by detecting both the flash of light and momentary change in the electric field produced by lightning. When both of these are detected within a few milliseconds of each other, the station registers a possible lightning strike. When a second possible lightning strike is detected within 15 minutes of the first, the station records a thunderstorm.

== Data dissemination ==
Data dissemination is usually via an automated VHF airband radio frequency (108-137 MHz) at each airport, broadcasting the automated weather observation. This is often via the automatic terminal information service (ATIS). Most automated weather stations also have discrete phone numbers to retrieve real-time observations over the phone or through a modem.

In the United States, the AWOS/ASOS data acquisition system (ADAS), a computer system run by the FAA, polls the systems remotely, accessing the observations and disseminating them worldwide electronically in METAR format.

== Limitations requiring human augmentation ==
At present, automated airport weather stations are unable to report a variety of meteorological conditions. These include:

- shallow or patchy fog
- blowing dust
- smoke
- falling ash
- volcanic eruptions
- tornadoes
- precipitation that is not in the form of rain or snow, such as hail, ice pellets and snow grains
- multiple forms of precipitation falling at the same time
- depth of new snowfall
- total snow depth
- in-cloud and cloud-to-cloud lightning
- clouds that are not directly above the station
- clouds that are more than twelve thousand feet above ground level
- cloud type

Because many of these can pose dangers to aircraft and all of these are of interest to the meteorological community, most of the busier airports also have part-time or full-time human observers who augment, or provide additional information to, the automated airport weather station's observations. Research is on-going to allow the automated stations to detect many of these phenomena.

Automated stations can also suffer from mechanical breakdown, requiring repair or replacement. This can be either due to physical damage (either natural or human caused), mechanical wear, or severe icing during winter weather. During system outages, human observers are often required to supplement missing or non-representative observations from the automated station. Research is also ongoing to produce more robust systems which are less vulnerable to natural damage, mechanical wear and icing.

== See also ==
- Automatic terminal information service
- Automatic weather station
- Remote Automated Weather Station
- Mesonet
- Surface weather observation and surface weather analysis
- SYNOP
