= Fiji Meteorological Service =

Meteorological service of Fiji

Agency overview
- Formed: July 1, 1975; 51 years ago
- Preceding agency: New Zealand Meteorological Service
- Headquarters: Nadi Airport Nadi, Fiji
- Agency executive: Misaeli Funaki, Director
- Parent agency: Ministry of Infrastructure and Meteorological Services
- Website: www.met.gov.fj

The Fiji Meteorological Service (FMS) is a Department of the government of Fiji responsible for providing weather forecasts and is based on the grounds of Nadi Airport in Nadi. The current director of Fiji Meteorological Service is Misaeli Funaki. Since 1985, FMS has been responsible for naming and tracking tropical cyclones in the Southwest Pacific region. Current Meteorologists working at FMS have a Graduate Diploma in Meteorology from the Australian Bureau of Meteorology.

== History ==
Before World War II, weather observations in Fiji were the responsibility of the harbour board and limited to recording various meteorological details at various locations around the island nation. During the 1939 Defence Conference in Wellington, New Zealand, Fiji's capital Suva was identified as the location of an upgraded meteorological service for the Pacific region. As a result, a facility was established at Laucala Bay during 1940, before it was expanded during the following year to support the operations of the Royal New Zealand Air Force. After the United States of America entered the war, meteorological operations were started at the Nadi Airport by the United States Army Air Forces Meteorological Unit during 1942.

After the war, the Nadi Weather Office (NWO) was converted to a civilian unit, before Laucala Bay's forecasting unit was moved and merged with Nadi's forecasting unit.

== Role ==
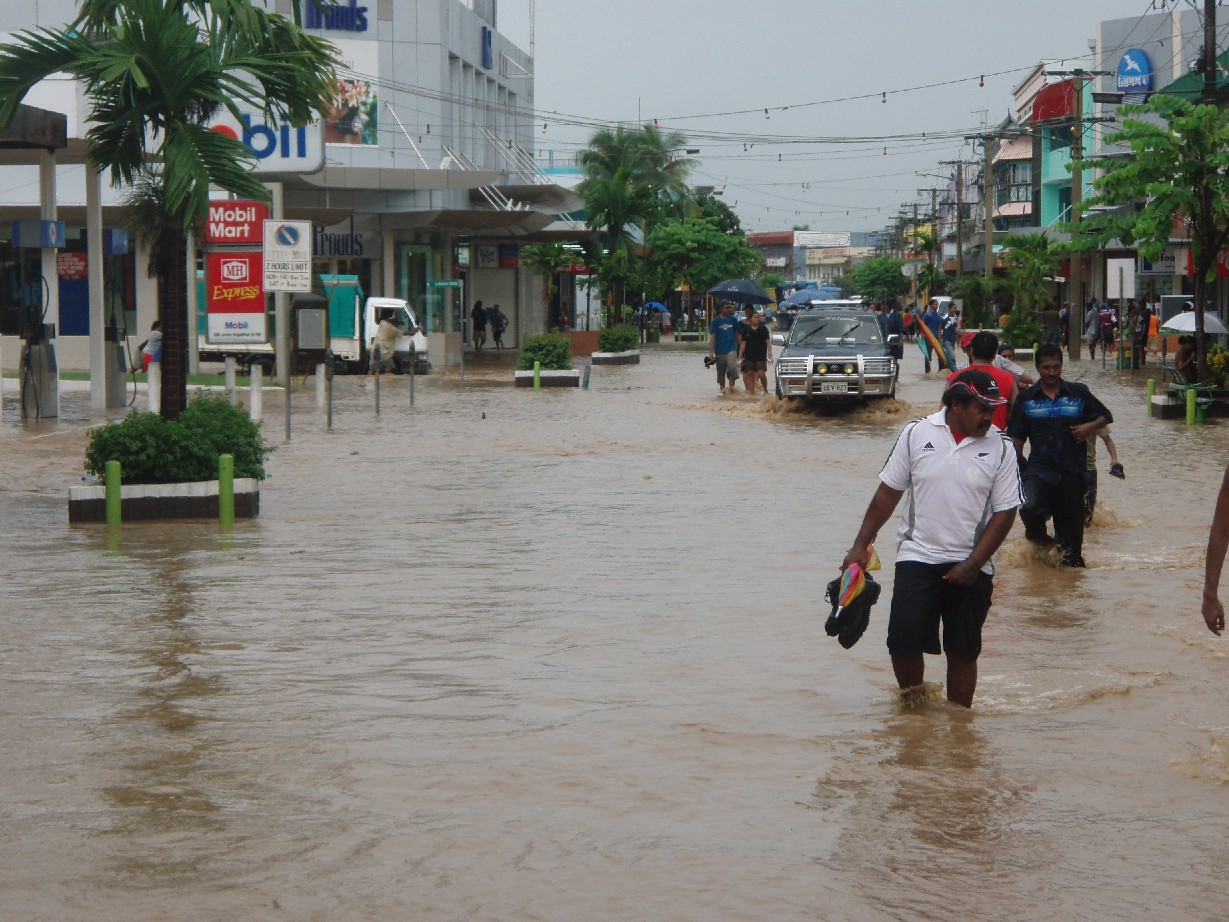

Since June 1995, the central weather office of Fiji, Nadi, has been one of six Regional Specialized Meteorological Centers within the World Weather Watch program of the World Meteorological Organization. Its specialty is forecasting tropical cyclones south of the equator to the 25th parallel south, and between the 160th meridian east and 120th meridian west longitude. FMS issues public and marine weather bulletins for Kiribati, Northern Cooks, Southern Cooks, Tuvalu, Tokelau, Niue, Nauru and Fiji. The Fiji Meteorological Services, as per agreement with the International Civil Aviation Organization, functions as the Meteorological Watch Office for the Nadi Flight Information Region (FIR), which extends from Western Kiribati to Tuvalu, Fiji, Vanuatu, Wallis and Futuna and New Caledonia. However, it still provides certain aviation forecast services to Cook Islands, Christmas Island (Line Islands), Samoa, Niue and Tonga which are situated outside the Nadi FIR boundary. Aviation products issued by FMS include Terminal Aerodrome Forecasts (TAF), Trend Type Forecasts (TTF), Area Forecasts, Route Forecasts, Inclement Weather Warnings for Nadi and Nausori Airports, Sigmets and Tropical Cyclone Advisories (TCA). Routine 24 hour TAF's are issued for Nadi (NFFN), Nausori (NFNA), Rarotonga (NCRG), Fuamotu (NFTF), Vavau (NFTV), Faleolo (NFSA), Niue, Tarawa (NGTA), and Christmas Island (PLCH) airports. 24 hour TAF's are also issued for Funafuti (NGFU) airport on certain days. TAF's (validity periods of less than 24 hours) are also issued for Aitutaki (NCAI), Manihiki (NCMH), Penrhyn (NCPY), Haapai (NFTL), Labasa (NFNL) and Rotuma (NFNR) airports.

== Tropical Cyclone Products Issued ==
Special Weather Bulletins (SWB's), Tropical Disturbance Advisories (TDA's), Special Advisory for Samoa, Tropical Cyclone Advisories (TCA's), Tropical Cyclone Sigmets, CREX bulletins, International Marine Warnings associated with tropical cyclones (WTPS and WHPS) and Tropical cyclone forecast and uncertainty tracks are the tropical cyclone products issued by FMS.

== See also ==
- 2026–27 South Pacific cyclone season
- Meteorological Service of New Zealand Limited
- Australian Bureau of Meteorology
