= SHGR =

SHGR may refer to:

- Hail, in the METAR format for reporting weather information
- Super High Graphics Resolution, a graphics mode for the Apple IIGS platform
