= METAR =

Format for weather reports used in aviation

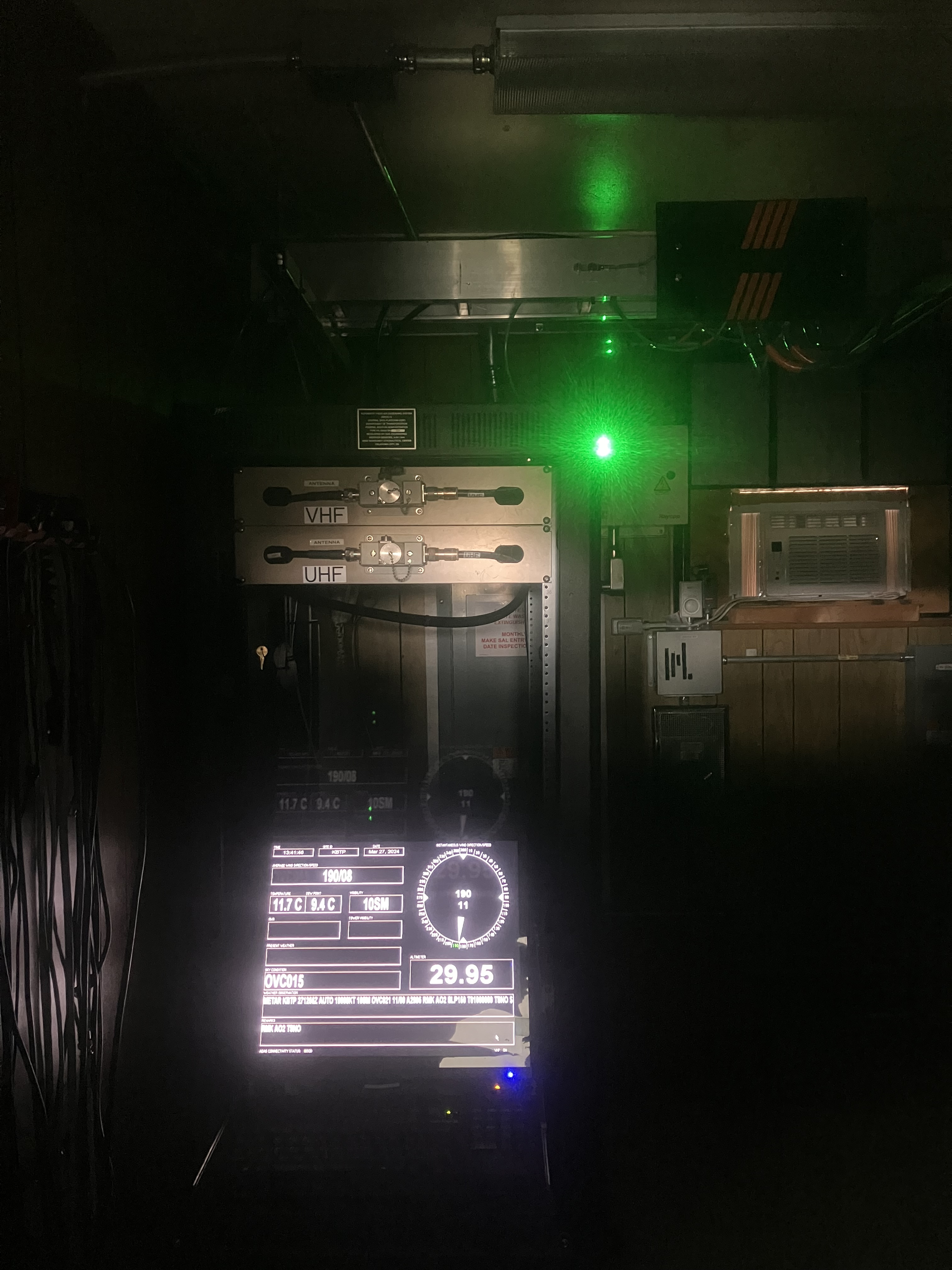
A METAR processing and transmitting unit installed at Pittsburgh-Butler Regional Airport, Pennsylvania, U.S.

METAR is a format for reporting weather information. A METAR weather report is predominantly used by aircraft pilots, and by meteorologists, who use aggregated METAR information to assist in weather forecasting.

Raw METAR is highly standardized through the International Civil Aviation Organization (ICAO), which enables it to be understood throughout most of the world.

== Report names ==
Although it is capitalized like an acronym, the origin of the word "METAR" has not been confirmed. The United Nations International Civil Aviation Organization (ICAO) refers to the Meteorological Aerodrome Report while other sources link the acronym to METeorological Terminal Aviation Routine Weather Report. Some unofficial English-language sources suggest that the acronym comes from French phrases such as ''MÉTéorologique Aviation Régulière''. However, this seems unlikely since authoritative sources in French agree that the name comes from the ICAO's "METeorological Aerodrome Report". Other organizations make no attempt to connect their terminology with the METAR acronym. For example, in its publication the Aeronautical Information Manual (AIM), the United States Federal Aviation Administration (FAA) describes the report as aviation routine weather report, while the international authority for the code form, the World Meteorological Organization (WMO), describes it as the aerodrome routine meteorological report. The National Oceanic and Atmospheric Administration (part of the United States Department of Commerce) and the United Kingdom's Met Office both employ the definition used by the FAA.

== Frequencies and types ==
METARs typically come from airports or other permanent weather observation stations. Reports are generated once an hour or half-hour at most stations, but if conditions change significantly at a staffed location, a report known as a special (SPECI) may be issued. (Note: Criteria for issuing a SPECI includes beginning or ending of hazardous weather, aircraft mishap, decreasing visibility or ceiling, or any other condition deemed critical by the observer of the responsible agency.) Some stations make regular reports more frequently, such as Pierce County Airport (ICAO code: KPLU) which issues reports three times per hour. In addition to METARs and SPECIs, ASOS One-Minute Observations (OMO) are updated once a minute. OMOs can be in various formats, including the METAR format.

Some METARs are encoded by automated airport weather stations located at airports, military bases, and other sites. Some locations still use augmented observations, which are recorded by digital sensors, encoded via software, and then reviewed by certified weather observers or forecasters prior to being transmitted. Observations may also be taken by trained observers or forecasters who manually observe and encode their observations prior to transmission. In the United States, prior to mid-1990s, most observations were made manually, but today the vast majority are automated or augmented observations.

== History ==
The METAR format was introduced internationally on 1 January 1968, and has been modified a number of times since. North American countries continued to use a Surface Aviation Observation (SAO) for current weather conditions until 1 June 1996, when this report was replaced with an approved variant of the METAR agreed upon in a 1989 Geneva agreement. The WMO's publication No. 782 "Aerodrome Reports and Forecasts" contains the base METAR code as adopted by the WMO member countries.

== Digital dissemination ==
METAR and TAF data are distributed globally through aeronautical fixed telecommunication networks and are also made available via internet services. They are consumed by airline operations centres, automated briefing systems and a wide range of general aviation tools, including web-based briefing portals, electronic flight bags and mobile applications that display weather overlays on maps and provide route-based summaries of observed and forecast conditions.

== Information contained in a METAR ==
A typical METAR contains data for the airport identifier, time of observation, wind direction and speed, visibility, current weather phenomena such as precipitation, cloud cover and heights, temperature, dew point, and barometric pressure. This information forms the body of the report, consisting a maximum of 11 groups of information. A METAR may also contain information on precipitation amounts, lightning, and other information that would be of interest to pilots or meteorologists such as a pilot report or PIREP, colour states and runway visual range (RVR). These may be provided in coded or plain language and appended to the end of the METAR as remarks.

In addition, a short period forecast called a TREND may be added at the end of the METAR covering likely changes in weather conditions in the two hours following the observation. These are in the same format as a terminal aerodrome forecast (TAF).

The complement to METARs, reporting forecast weather rather than current weather, are TAFs. METARs and TAFs are used in VOLMET broadcasts.

=== Cloud reporting ===
Cloud coverage is reported by the number of "oktas" (eighths) of the sky that is occupied by cloud. Automated substation substitutes time averaging of sensor data gathered during 30-minute period prior to reporting.

This is reported as:

Cloud coverage codes
Abbreviation	Meaning
SKC	"No cloud/Sky clear" used worldwide but in North America is used to indicate a human generated report
NCD	"Nil Cloud detected" automated METAR station has not detected any cloud, either due to a lack of it, or due to an error in the sensors
CLR	"No clouds below 12,000 ft (3,700 m) (US) or 25,000 ft (7,600 m) (Canada)", used mainly within North America and indicates a station that is at least partly automated
NSC	"No (nil) significant cloud", i.e., none below 5,000 ft (1,500 m) and no TCU or CB. Not used in North America.
FEW	"Few" = 1–2 oktas
SCT	"Scattered" = 3–4 oktas
BKN	"Broken" = 5–7 oktas
OVC	"Overcast" = 8 oktas, i.e., full cloud coverage
TCU	Towering cumulus cloud, e.g., SCT016TCU
CB	Cumulonimbus cloud, e.g., FEW015CB
VV	"Vertical visibility" = clouds cannot be seen because of fog or heavy precipitation, so vertical visibility is given instead.

The following codes identify the cloud types used in the 8/nnn part of RMK.

WMO codes for cloud types
Code	Low clouds	Middle clouds	High clouds
0	none	none	none
1	Cumulus (fair weather)	Altostratus (thin)	Cirrus (filaments)
2	Cumulus (towering)	Altostratus (thick)	Cirrus (dense)
3	Cumulonimbus (no anvil)	Altocumulus (thin)	Cirrus (often with cumulonimbus)
4	Stratocumulus (from cumulus)	Altocumulus (patchy)	Cirrus (thickening)
5	Stratocumulus (not cumulus)	Altocumulus (thickening)	Cirrus / cirrostratus (low in sky)
6	Stratus or Fractostratus (fair)	Altocumulus (from cumulus)	Cirrus / cirrostratus (high in sky)
7	Fractocumulus / fractostratus (bad weather)	Altocumulus (with altocumulus, altostratus, nimbostratus)	Cirrostratus (entire sky)
8	Cumulus and stratocumulus	Altocumulus (with turrets)	Cirrostratus (partial)
9	Cumulonimbus (thunderstorm)	Altocumulus (chaotic)	Cirrocumulus or Cirrocumulus / cirrus / cirrostratus
/	not valid	above overcast	above overcast

=== Wind reporting ===
Wind observation measures the horizontal vector component of the wind, which includes both direction and speed. These are determined by evaluating the measurement over a 2-minute period.

The wind direction is coded with the first three digits in tens of degrees relative to the true north. If wind speed is less than or equal to 6 kn (11 km/h; 6.9 mph), the wind direction will be displayed as variable or "VRB". If the wind speed is greater than 6 knots, but the direction varies more than 60° in the past 2 minutes, METAR will report the range of wind direction. For example, 21010KT 180V240 suggests the wind was variable from 180° to 240° at 10 knots.

Immediately after the wind direction is the wind speed, coded in two or three digits measured in knots, km/h or m/s. If during past 10 minutes, the weather station detects more than 10 kn (19 km/h; 12 mph) between minimum and maximum windspeed, METAR determines a wind gust exists and reports the maximum instantaneous windspeed.

If the air is motionless, the wind will be reported as calm and coded as 00000KT.

=== Visibility and runway visual range ===
Visibility measures the atmospheric opacity. It is the greatest distance where at least half of the horizon circle can be seen from the surface.

Runway visual range (RVR) is an instrument-derived measurement that suggests the horizontal distance an observer may see down the runway. In the US, for stations with RVR reporting capacity, this information is omitted from the METAR unless the visibility is at or below 1 mi (1.6 km), or the designated instrument runway's RVR is at or below 6,000 ft (1,800 m). RVR of up to four designated runways may be reported, depending on the country.

== Regulations and conventions ==
METAR code is regulated by the World Meteorological Organization in consort with the International Civil Aviation Organization. In the United States, the code is given authority (with some US national differences from the WMO/ICAO model) under the Federal Meteorological Handbook No. 1 (FMH-1), which paved the way for the US Air Force Manual 15-111 on surface weather observations, being the authoritative document for the US Armed Forces. A very similar code form to the METAR is the SPECI. Both codes are defined at the technical regulation level in WMO Technical Regulation No. 49, Vol II, which is copied over to the WMO Manual No. 306 and to ICAO Annex III.

Although the general format of METARs is a global standard, the specific fields used within that format vary somewhat between general international usage and usage within North America. Note that there may be minor differences between countries using the international codes as there are between those using the North American conventions — ICAO allows member countries to modify METAR code for use in their particular countries, as long as ICAO is notified.

== Examples ==
The two examples which follow illustrate the primary differences between the international and the North American METAR variations.

=== International METAR codes ===
The following is an example METAR from Burgas Airport in Burgas, Bulgaria. It was taken on 4 February 2005 at 16:00 Coordinated Universal Time (UTC).

METAR LBBG 041600Z 12012MPS 090V150 1400 R04/P1500N R22/P1500U +SN BKN022 OVC050 M04/M07 Q1020 NOSIG 8849//91=

- METAR indicates that the following is a standard hourly observation.
- LBBG is the ICAO airport code for Burgas Airport.
- 041600Z indicates the time of the observation. It is the day of the month (04) followed by the time of day (1600 Zulu time, which equals 4:00 pm Greenwich Mean Time or 6:00 pm local time).
- 12012MPS indicates the wind direction is from 120° (east-southeast) at a speed of 12 m/s (23 kn; 27 mph; 43 km/h). Speed measurements can be in knots (abbreviated KT) or metres per second (abbreviated MPS).
- 090V150 indicates the wind direction is varying from 90° true (east) to 150° true (south-southeast).
- 1400 indicates the prevailing visibility is 1,400 m (4,600 ft).
- R04/P1500N indicates the Runway Visual Range (RVR) along runway 04 is 1,500 m (4,900 ft) and not changing significantly.
- R22/P1500U indicates RVR along runway 22 is 1,500 m (4,900 ft) and rising.
- +SN indicates snow is falling at a heavy intensity. If any precipitation begins with a minus or plus (-/+), it's either light or heavy.
- BKN022 indicates a broken (over half the sky) cloud layer with its base at 2,200 ft (670 m) above ground level (AGL). The lowest "BKN" or "OVC" layer specifies the cloud ceiling.
- OVC050 indicates an unbroken cloud layer (overcast) with its base at 5,000 ft (1,500 m) above ground level (AGL).
- M04/M07 indicates the temperature is −4 °C (25 °F) and the dew point is −7 °C (19 °F). An M in front of the number indicates that the temperature/dew point is below zero Celsius.
- Q1020 indicates the current altimeter setting (in QNH) is 1,020 hPa (30.12 inHg).
- NOSIG is an example of a trend type forecast (TREND) which is appended to METARs at stations while a forecaster is on watch. NOSIG means that no significant change is expected to the reported conditions within the next 2 hours.
- 8849//91 indicates the condition of the runway.
  - The first two characters indicate which runway is being described.
    - If there are two or more runways with the same number, some locations will use three characters (e.g. 25L and 25R). Otherwise, the left runway will use just its number and the right runway will add 50 (e.g. 25 = 25L and 75 = 25R).
    - 88 indicates all the airport's runways.
    - 99 indicates repetition of the last message as no new information received.
  - 4 means the runway is coated with dry snow
  - 9 means 51% to 100% of the runway is covered
  - // means the thickness of the coating was either not measurable or not affecting usage of the runway
  - 91 means the braking index is bad, in other words the tires have bad grip on the runway
- CAVOK is an abbreviation for Ceiling And Visibility OK, indicating no cloud below 5,000 ft (1,500 m) or the highest minimum sector altitude and no cumulonimbus or towering cumulus at any level, a visibility of 10 km (6 mi) or more and no significant weather change.
- = indicates the end of the METAR

=== North American METAR codes ===
North American METARs deviate from the WMO (who write the code on behalf of ICAO) FM 15-XII code. Details are listed in the FAA's Aeronautical Information Manual (AIM), but the non-compliant elements are mostly based on the use of non-standard units of measurement. This METAR example is from Trenton-Mercer Airport near Trenton, New Jersey, and was taken on 5 December 2003 at 18:53 UTC.

METAR KTTN 051853Z 04011KT 1/2SM VCTS SN FZFG BKN003 OVC010 M02/M02 A3006 RMK AO2 TSB40 SLP176 P0002 T10171017=

- METAR indicates that the following is a standard hourly observation.
- KTTN is the ICAO identifier for the Trenton-Mercer Airport.
- 051853Z indicates the day of the month is the 5th and the time of day is 1853 Zulu/UTC, or 1:53PM Eastern Standard Time.
- 04011KT indicates the wind is from 040° true (north east) at 11 knots (20 km/h; 13 mph). In the United States, the wind direction must have a 60° or greater variance for variable wind direction to be reported and the wind speed must be greater than 3 knots (5.6 km/h; 3.5 mph).
- 1/2SM indicates the prevailing visibility is 1/2 mi (800 m) SM = statute mile.
- VCTS indicates a thunderstorm (TS) in the vicinity (VC), which means from 5–10 mi (8–16 km).
- SN indicates snow is falling at a moderate intensity; a preceding plus or minus sign (+/-) indicates heavy or light precipitation. Without a +/- sign, moderate precipitation is assumed.
- FZFG indicates the presence of freezing fog.
- BKN003 OVC010 indicates a broken (5/8 to 7/8 of the sky covered) cloud layer at 300 ft (91 m) above ground level (AGL) and an overcast (8/8 of the sky covered) layer at 1,000 ft (300 m).
- M02/M02 indicates the temperature is −2 °C (28 °F) and the dew point is −2 °C (28 °F). An M in front of the number indicates a negative Celsius temperature/dew point ("minus").
- A3006 indicates the altimeter setting is 30.06 inHg (1,018 hPa).
- RMK indicates the remarks section follows.

Note that what follows are not part of standard observations outside of the United States and can vary significantly.

- AO2 indicates that the station is automated with a precipitation discriminator (rain/snow) sensor. (Note: Precipitation discriminators are electrically heated at sub-freezing temperatures to calculate the water equivalent of frozen precipitation and snow accumulation.) Stations that aren't equipped with a rain/snow sensor are designated AO1.
- TSB40 indicates the thunderstorm began at 40 minutes past the hour at 1840 Zulu/UTC, or 1:40 p.m. Eastern Standard Time.
- SLP176 indicates the current barometric pressure extrapolated to sea level is 1,017.6 hPa (30.05 inHg).
- P0002 indicates that 0.02 inches (0.5 mm) of liquid-equivalent precipitation accumulated during the last hour.
- T10171017 is a breakdown of the temperature and dew point in eight digits separated into two groups of four. The first four digits (1017) indicate the temperature. The first digit (1) designates above or below zero Celsius (0=above zero 1=below zero). The next three digits in the group "017" give the temperature in degrees and tenths of a degree Celsius, −1.7 °C (28.9 °F). The last four digits "1017" indicate the dew point, −1.7 °C (28.9 °F). Note: ASOS software, as of this update, uses whole degrees in °F to compute the °C values in this group.
- = indicates the end of the METAR.

In Canada, RMK is followed by a description of the cloud layers and opacities, in eighths (oktas). For example, CU5 would indicate a cumulus layer with 5/8 opacity.

== Flight categories in the US ==
METARs can be expressed concisely using so-called aviation flight categories, which indicates what classes of flight can operate at each airport by referring to the visibility and ceiling in each METAR. Four categories are used in the US:

METARS expressed as US flight categories
Category	Visibility	Ceiling
VFR	> 5 mi	and > 3000 ft AGL
Marginal VFR	Between 3 and 5 mi	and/or between 1,000 and 3,000 ft AGL
IFR	1 mi or more but less than 3 mi	and/or 500 ft or more but less than 1,000 ft
Low IFR	< 1 mi	and/or < 500 ft

== METAR weather codes ==
METAR abbreviations used in the weather and events section. Remarks section will also include begin and end times of the weather events. Codes before remarks will be listed as "-RA" for "light rain". Codes listed after remarks may be listed as "RAB15E25" for "Rain began at 15 minutes after the top of the last hour and ended at 25 minutes after the top of the last hour."

Combinations of two precipitation types are accepted; e.g., RASN (rain and snow mixed), SHGSSN etc. If more than one type of weather is present, METAR will report in the following order:

1. Tornadic activity
2. Thunderstorm
3. Most dominating weather
4. Precipitation
5. Obscuration

Type	Abbr.	Meaning
Intensity	-	Light intensity
Intensity	(blank)	Moderate intensity
Intensity	+	Heavy intensity
Descriptor	VC	In the vicinity (5–10 mi / 8–16 km from station); visible phenomena: TS, SH, FG, DS, SS, VA, PO, FC, BLSN, BLDU, BLSA
Descriptor	RE	Recent hour's most important past phenomenon with residues: TS, RA, FZRA, SN, BLSN, GR, GS, PL (e.g.: METAR ... Q1010 RERA=)
Descriptor	MI	Shallow [French: Mince] (fog descriptor)
Descriptor	PR	Partial (fog descriptor)
Descriptor	BC	Patches [French: Bancs] (fog descriptor)
Descriptor	DR	Low drifting below eye level; including: DRSN, DRSA, DRDU
Descriptor	BL	Blowing at or above eye level; including: BLSN, BLSA, BLDU
Descriptor*	SH	Showers (*also without precipitation: VCSH)
Descriptor*	TS	Thunderstorm (*also without precipitation: VCTS, RETS or as thunder)
Descriptor	FZ	Freezing; including: FZDZ, FZRA, FZFG
Precipitation	DZ	Drizzle
Precipitation	RA	Rain
Precipitation	SN	Snow (snowflakes)
Precipitation	SG	Snow grains
Precipitation	GS	Graupel [French: Grésil], snow pellets and/or small hail (not in the US). (Note: In the US small hail is included with regular hail and the Remarks section is used saying "GR LESS THAN 1/4".) Elsewhere hail is GR when it is 5 mm or greater Outside of the US when the hail is less than 5 mm the code GS is used.)
Precipitation	GR	Hail [French: Grêle] (in the US includes small hail)
Precipitation	PL	Ice pellets
Precipitation	IC	Ice crystals
Precipitation	UP	Unknown precipitation
Obscuration	FG	Fog (visibility less than 1 km)
Obscuration	BR	Mist [French: Brume] (due to water droplets, visibility between 1 and 5 km) (Note: If the difference between temperature and dewpoint is less than or equal to 2°C, the station reports the condition as haze; else mist is reported.)
Obscuration	HZ	Haze (due to dry particulates, visibility between 1 and 5 km)
Obscuration	VA	Volcanic ash
Obscuration	DU	Widespread dust
Obscuration	FU	Smoke [French: Fumée]
Obscuration	SA	Sand
Obscuration	PY	Spray, only coded as BLPY
Other	SQ	Squall
Other	PO	Dust [French: Poussière] or sand whirls
Other	DS	Duststorm
Other	SS	Sandstorm
Other	FC	Funnel cloud
Time	B	Began at time
Time	E	Ended at time
Time	2 digits	Minutes of current hour
Time	4 digits	Hour/minutes Zulu time

=== US METAR abbreviations ===
The following METAR abbreviations are used in the United States; some are used worldwide:

METAR and TAF abbreviations and acronyms:

Abbreviation	Meaning	Abbreviation	Meaning
$	maintenance check indicator	/	indicator that visual range data follows; separator between temperature and dew point data.
ACC	altocumulus castellanus	ACFT MSHP	aircraft mishap
ACSL	altocumulus standing lenticular cloud	ALP	airport location point
ALQDS	all quadrants (official)	ALQS	all quadrants (unofficial)
AO1	automated station without precipitation discriminator	AO2	automated station with precipitation discriminator
APCH	approach	APRNT	apparent
APRX	approximately	ATCT	airport traffic control tower
AUTO	fully automated report	C	center (with reference to runway designation)
CA	cloud-air lightning	CB	cumulonimbus cloud
CBMAM	cumulonimbus mammatus cloud	CC	cloud-cloud lightning
CCSL	cirrocumulus standing lenticular cloud	cd	candela
CG	cloud-ground lightning	CHI	cloud-height indicator
CHINO	sky condition at secondary location not available	CIG	ceiling
CONS	continuous	COR	correction to a previously disseminated observation
DOC	Department of Commerce	DOD	Department of Defense
DOT	Department of Transportation	DSIPTG	dissipating
DSNT	distant	DVR	dispatch visual range
E	east, ended, estimated ceiling (SAO)	FAA	Federal Aviation Administration
FIBI	filed but impracticable to transmit	FIRST	first observation after a break in coverage at manual station
FMH-1	Federal Meteorological Handbook No.1, Surface Weather Observations & Reports (METAR)	FMH2	Federal Meteorological Handbook No.2, Surface Synoptic Codes
FROPA	frontal passage	FROIN	frost on the indicator
FRQ	frequent	FT	feet
FZRANO	freezing rain sensor not available	G	gust
HLSTO	hailstone	ICAO	International Civil Aviation Organization
INCRG	increasing	INTMT	intermittent
KT	knots	L	left (with reference to runway designation)
LAST	last observation before a break in coverage at a manual station	LST	local standard time
LTG	lightning	LWR	lower
M	minus, less than	MAX	maximum
METAR	routine weather report provided at fixed intervals	MIN	minimum
MOV	moved/moving/movement	MT	mountains
N	north	N/A	not applicable
NCDC	National Climatic Data Center	NE	northeast
NOS	National Ocean Service	NOSPECI	no SPECI reports are taken at the station
NOTAM	Notice to Airmen	NW	northwest
NWS	National Weather Service	OCNL	occasional
OFCM	Office of the Federal Coordinator for Meteorology	OHD	overhead
OVR	over	P	indicates greater than the highest reportable value
PCPN	precipitation	PK WND	peak wind
PNO	precipitation amount not available	PRES	pressure
PRESFR	pressure falling rapidly	PRESRR	pressure rising rapidly
PWINO	precipitation identifier sensor not available	R	right (with reference to runway designation), runway
RTD	Routine Delayed (late) observation	RV	reportable value
RVR	Runway visual range	RVRNO	RVR system values not available
RWY	runway	S	south
SCSL	stratocumulus standing lenticular cloud	SE	southeast
SFC	surface, i.e., ground level)	SLP	sea-level pressure
SLPNO	sea-level pressure not available	SM	statute miles
SNINCR	snow increasing rapidly	SOG	snow on the ground
SPECI	an unscheduled report taken when certain criteria have been met	STN	station
SW	southwest	TCU	towering cumulus
TS	thunderstorm	TSNO	thunderstorm information not available
TWR	tower	UNKN	unknown
UTC	Coordinated Universal Time	V	variable
VIS	visibility	VISNO	visibility at secondary location not available
VR	visual range	VRB	variable
W	west	WG/SO	Working Group for Surface Observations
WMO	World Meteorological Organization	WND	wind
WS	wind shear	WSHFT	wind shift
Z	Zulu, i.e., Coordinated Universal Time		

=== US METAR numeric codes ===
Additional METAR numeric codes listed after RMK.

Code	Description
11234	6-hour maximum temperature. Follows RMK with five digits starting with 1. Second digit is 0 for positive and 1 for negative. The last 3 digits equal the temperature in tenths. This example value equals −23.4 °C (−10 °F).
20123	6-hour minimum temperature. Follows RMK with five digits starting with 2. Second digit is 0 for positive and 1 for negative. The last 3 digits equal the temperature in tenths. This example value equals 12.3 °C (54 °F).
4/012	Total snow depth in inches. Follows RMK starting with 4/ and followed by 3 digit number that equals snow depth in inches. This example value equals 12 inches of snow currently on the ground.
402340123	24-hour maximum and minimum temperature. Follows RMK with nine digits starting with 4. The second and sixth digit equals 0 for positive for 1 for negative. Digits 3–5 equal the maximum temperature in tenths and the digits 7–9 equals the minimum temperature in tenths. This example value equals 23.4 and 12.3 °C (74 and 54 °F).
52006	3-hour pressure tendency. Follows RMK with 5 digits starting with 5. The second digit gives the tendency. In general 0–3 is rising, 4 is steady and 5–8 is falling. The last 3 digits give the pressure change in tenths of a millibar in the last 3 hours. This example indicates a rising tendency of 0.6 millibars (0.018 inHg).
60123	3- or 6-hour precipitation amount. Follows RMK with 5 digits starting with 6. The last 4 digits are the inches of rain in hundredths. If used for the observation nearest to 00:00, 06:00, 12:00, or 18:00 UTC, it represents a 6-hour precipitation amount. If used in the observation nearest to 03:00, 09:00, 15:00 or 21:00 UTC, it represents a 3-hour precipitation amount. This example shows 1.23 inches (31 mm) of rain.
70246	24-hour precipitation amount. Follows RMK with 5 digits starting with 7. The last 4 digits are the inches of rain in hundredths. This example shows 2.46 inches (62 mm) of rain.
8/765	Cloud cover using WMO code. Follows RMK starting with 8/ followed by a 3 digit number representing WMO cloud codes.
98060	Duration of sunshine in minutes. Follows RMK with 5 digits starting with 98. The last 3 digits are the total minutes of sunshine. This example indicates 60 minutes of sunshine.
931222	Snowfall in the last 6 hours. Follows RMK with 6 digits starting with 931. The last 3 digits are the total snowfall in inches and tenths. This example indicates 22.2 inches (560 mm) of snowfall.
933021	Liquid water equivalent of the snow (SWE). Follows RMK with 6 digits starting with 933. The last 3 digits are the total inches in tenths. This example indicates 2.1 inches (53 mm) SWE.

== See also ==
- BUFR
- CLIMAT
- GAFOR
- IWXXM
