= Gafoor =

Gafoor is a surname. Notable people with the surname include:

- B. M. Gafoor (1942–2003), Indian cartoonist and comic artist
- Hasan Gafoor (1950–2012), Indian public official
- Naslen K. Gafoor, Indian actor
- P. K. Abdul Gafoor (died 1984), Indian educator

== See also ==
- GAFOR
