= Prevailing =

Prevailing may refer to:

- Prevailing winds
- Prevailing visibility
- Prevailing wage
