= Ceiling (cloud) =

Measurement of the height of the base of the lowest clouds

In aviation, ceiling is a measurement of the height of the base of the lowest clouds (not to be confused with cloud base which has a specific definition) that cover more than half of the sky (more than 4 oktas) relative to the ground. Ceiling is not specifically reported as part of the METAR used for flight planning by pilots worldwide, but can be deduced from the lowest height with broken (BKN) or overcast (OVC) reported. A ceiling listed as "unlimited" means either that the sky is mostly free of cloud cover, or that the clouds are high enough not to impede visual flight rules (VFR) operation.

== Definitions ==
ICAO
The height above the ground or water of the base of the lowest level of cloud below 6,000 metres (20,000 feet) covering more than half the sky.

Canada
A ceiling is the lesser of the following: the height above ground or water of the base of the lowest layer of cloud covering more than half of the sky, or the vertical visibility in a surface-based layer which completely obscures the whole sky. Therefore, a ceiling exists at the height of the first layer for which a coverage symbol of BKN or OVC is reported. The existence of a vertical visibility constitutes an obscured ceiling.

EASA States
The height above the ground or water of the base of the lowest layer of cloud below 6,000 m (20,000 ft) covering more than half the sky.

United Kingdom
The height above the ground or water of the base of the lowest layer of cloud below 6,000 m (20,000 ft) covering more than half the sky.

United States
The height above the Earth's surface of the lowest layer of clouds or obscuring phenomena that is reported as broken, overcast, or obscuration, and not classified as thin or partial.
