= Trend type forecast =

In aviation meteorology, a trend type forecast (TTF), also known simply as a trend, is a weather forecast written by a person on location at a major airport or military base. A TTF is a professionally considered forecast for weather over a two-hour period, and is based on an actual weather report, such as a METAR or SPECI and appended to the end of it. A TTF is similar to or sometimes in addition to a TAF, a terminal aerodrome forecast, but during the TTF's validity period is considered superior to a TAF.

== Example ==
EGXE 061150Z 03010KT 9999 FEW020 17/11 Q1014 BLU TEMPO 6000 SHRA SCT020 WHT=

In this example the METAR indicates it is from EGXE (RAF Leeming) at 1150 UTC on Day 6. The observation follows (see METAR for explanation), with the Trend added to the end of the observation.

The Trend reads TEMPO 6000 SHRA SCT020 WHT i.e. Temporary deterioration to 6 km visibility in a moderate rain shower with scattered at 2000 ft, colour state White.
