= Prevailing visibility =

Measure of visibility used in aviation

Prevailing visibility in aviation is a measurement of the greatest distance visible throughout at least half of the horizon, not necessarily continuously. To take the prevailing visibility, controllers reference a number of visual reference points: usually buildings, hills, or other geographic features. The value obtained is usually reported on a METAR and recorded on the ATIS.

In Canada, it is the maximum visibility value common to sectors comprising one-half or more of the horizon circle. The horizon circle may be divided into as many sections as required based on differing visibilities.

When the prevailing visibility is less than 4 miles, or goes from less than 4 miles to four miles or greater, tower personnel are required to take a prevailing visibility reading. If this reading differs from the ground reading (i.e., different readings for different heights), the lower value of the two is used for aircraft operations. Also visibility is defined as greatest distance at which an object of specified characteristics can be seen and identified by an observer with normal flight under normal condition in daylight.
