= Terminal aerodrome forecast =

Format for reporting aviation weather forecast information

In meteorology and aviation, terminal aerodrome forecast (TAF) is a format for reporting weather forecast information, particularly as it relates to aviation.

TAFs complement and use similar encoding to METAR reports. They are produced by a human forecaster based on the ground. For this reason, there are considerably fewer TAF locations than there are airports for which METARs are available. TAFs can be more accurate than numerical weather forecasts, since they take into account local, small-scale, geographic effects.

Today, according to the advancement of technology in civil aviation, the TAF is sent as IWXXM model.

== Issuance, amendment and cancellation ==
In the United States, TAFs are issued for nearly 700 airports. Most of them provide a 24-hour forecast for the airport, with some major airports forecasting for 30 hours into the future. TAFs are issued at least four times a day, every six hours, for major civil airfields: 0000, 0600, 1200 and 1800 UTC, and generally apply to a 24- or 30-hour period, and an area within approximately five statute miles (8.0 km) (or 5 nautical miles (9.3 km) in Canada) from the center of an airport runway complex. TAFs are issued every three hours for military airfields and some civil airfields and cover a period ranging from 3 hours to 30 hours.

Different countries use different change criteria for their weather groups. In the United Kingdom, TAFs for military airfields use colour states as one of the change criteria. Civil airfields in the UK use slightly different criteria.

If information sources, such as surface observations, are missing, unreliable, or not complete, forecasters will append AMD NOT SKED to the end of a TAF. This code indicates the forecaster has enough data, using the total observation concept, to issue a forecast, but will not provide updates. This allows airport operations to continue using a valid TAF. In rare situations where observations have been missing for extended periods of time (i.e., more than one TAF cycle of 6 hours) and the total observation concept cannot provide sufficient information, the TAF may be suspended by the use of NIL TAF.

== Responsible agencies ==
In the United States, the weather forecasters responsible for the TAFs in their respective areas are located within one of the 122 Weather Forecast Offices operated by the United States' National Weather Service. In contrast, a trend type forecast (TTF), which is similar to a TAF, is always produced by a person on-site where the TTF applies. In the United Kingdom, most TAFs for military airfields are produced locally, however TAFs for civil airfields are produced at the Met Office headquarters in Exeter.

The United States Air Force employs active duty enlisted personnel as TAF writers. Air Force weather personnel are responsible for providing weather support for all Air Force and Army operations.

== Code ==
This TAF example of a 30-hour TAF was released on November 5, 2008, at 1730 UTC:

TAF 
KXYZ 051730Z 0518/0624 31008KT 3SM -SHRA BKN020
     FM052300 30006KT 5SM -SHRA OVC030 
       PROB30 0604/0606 VRB20G35KT 1SM TSRA BKN015CB 
     FM060600 25010KT 4SM -SHRA OVC050
       TEMPO 0608/0611 2SM -SHRA OVC030  
     RMK NXT FCST BY 00Z=

The first line contains identification and validity times.

- TAF indicates that the following is a terminal aerodrome forecast. This line may also indicate an amended forecast (TAF AMD) or a corrected forecast (TAF COR)
- KXYZ indicates the airport to which the forecast applies (ICAO airport code).
- 051730Z indicates that the report was issued on the 5th of the month at 1730 UTC (also known as Zulu, hence the Z).
- 0518/0624 indicates that the report is valid from the 5th at 1800 UTC until the 6th at 2400 UTC.

The remainder of the first line contain the initial forecast conditions. Variations of the codes used for various weather conditions are many.

- 31008KT indicates that the wind will be from 310° true at 8 knots (9 mph; 4 m/s).
- 3SM -SHRA BKN020 indicates that visibility will be 3 statute miles (5 km) in light (-) showers (SH) of rain (RA), with a broken ceiling (between 5/8 and 7/8 of the sky covered) at 2,000 feet (600 m) above ground level (AGL).

Each line beginning with FM indicates a rapid change in the weather over a period of less than an hour.

- FM052300 indicates the next period lasts from (FM) the 5th at 2300 UTC to the 6th at 0600 UTC (the effective time on the next FM line). The remainder of the line has similar formatting to the other forecast lines: 30006KT wind from 300° at 6 knots (11 km/h; 6.9 mph), 5SM visibility 5 statute miles (8 km), -SHRA light rain showers, OVC030 overcast at 3,000 feet (900 m).
  - PROB30 indicates a 30% probability of the following temporary conditions on the 6th between 0400 UTC and 0600 UTC: VRB20G35KT wind of variable direction at 20 knots (35 km/h; 25 mph) with gusts up to 35 knots (65 km/h; 40 mph), 1SM visibility 1 statute mile (1.6 km), TSRA thunderstorms and rain, BKN015CB broken cumulonimbus clouds at 1,500 feet (450 m).
- FM060600 indicates that the next period lasts from the 6th at 0600 UTC until 2400 UTC (the end of the forecast period, as there is no following FM): 25010KT wind from 250° at 10 knots (20 km/h; 10 mph), 4SM visibility 4 statute miles (6.5 km), -SHRA light rain showers, OVC050 overcast at 5,000 feet (1,500 m).
  - TEMPO means that these conditions are temporarily replaced, for periods up to 50% of the time, lasting up to 1 hour for each occurrence, between 0800 UTC and 1100 UTC with: 2SM visibility 2 statute miles (3 km), -SHRA light rain showers, OVC030 overcast at 3,000 feet (900 m). (The wind speed remains the same, as it is not mentioned.)

The final line is for errata, comments, and remarks.

- RMK NXT FCST BY 00Z indicates a remark that the next forecast will be issued by 0000 UTC.

== See also ==
- Area forecast
- IWXXM
- METAR
- Pilot report
- Trend type forecast
