= Automatic terminal information service =

Broadcast of aeronautical information

Automatic terminal information service, or ATIS, is a continuous broadcast of recorded aeronautical information in busier terminal areas. ATIS broadcasts contain essential information, such as current weather information, active runways, available approaches, and any other information required by the pilots, such as important NOTAMs. Pilots usually listen to an available ATIS broadcast before contacting the local control unit, which reduces the controllers' workload and relieves frequency congestion. ATIS was developed and adopted by the FAA in the mid-1960s and internationally (under the direction of ICAO) beginning in 1974. (Note: The concept of conveying information from ground-based locations to pilots by voice was first tested with radio beacons in the early 1950s. However, this system was rudimentary and only stated the name of the airport.) Before the adoption of ATIS, this information was routinely disseminated to each aircraft separately, increasing controller workload during periods of high traffic density.

In the U.S., ATIS will include (in this order): the airport or facility name; a phonetic letter code; time of the latest weather observation in UTC; weather information, consisting of wind direction and velocity, visibility, obstructions to vision, sky condition, temperature, dew point, altimeter setting, density altitude advisory if appropriate; and other pertinent remarks, including runway in use. If it exists, the weather observation includes remarks of lightning, cumulonimbus, and towering cumulus clouds. Additionally, ATIS may contain man-portable air-defense systems (MANPADS) alert and advisory, reported unauthorized laser illumination events, instrument or visual approaches in use, departure runways, taxiway closures, new or temporary changes to runway length, runway condition and codes, other optional information, and advisories.

The recording is updated in fixed intervals or when there is a significant change in the information, such as a change in the active runway. It is given a letter designation (alpha, bravo, charlie, etc.) from the ICAO spelling alphabet. The letter progresses through the alphabet with every update and starts at alpha after a break in service of twelve hours or more. When contacting the local control unit, pilots indicate their information <letter>, where <letter> is the ATIS identification letter of the ATIS transmission the pilot received. This helps the ATC controller verify that the pilot has current information.

Many airports also employ the use of data-link ATIS (D-ATIS, introduced in 1996). D-ATIS is a text-based, digitally transmitted version of the ATIS audio broadcast. It is accessed via a data link service such as the ACARS and displayed on an electronic display in the aircraft. D-ATIS is incorporated on the aircraft as part of its electronic system, such as an EFB or an FMS. D-ATIS may be incorporated into the core ATIS system or be realized as a separate system with a data interface between voice ATIS and D-ATIS.

The ATIS is not to be confused with the METAR, which will not contain certain information such as the runway in use.

== Sample messages ==
=== Example at a General Aviation airport in the UK (Gloucestershire Airport) ===
Information Section	Details
Airfield this ATIS broadcast is for	Gloucester (phonetically GLOSTER)
ICAO spelling alphabet letter	Quebec
Time (UTC)	14:20
Runway in use	25L (250º)
Circuit direction (general aviation)	right-hand circuit
Wind speed and direction	251º @ 5 kts
Visibility	10 kilometres or more (maximum)
Cloud cover	Few @ 2800 feet and broken @ 5000 feet
Temperature	27 °C
Dew point	26 °C
QNH (pressure @ mean sea level)	1020 - hectoPascals is dictated below 1018 hPa
QFE (pressure @ airfield elevation)	1017 - hectoPascals is dictated below 1080 hPa
Other information	Request to report altimeter setting in use on first contact. Noise abatement procedures in effect. Tower frequency: 122.900 MHz (departing aircraft) Approach frequency: 128.550 MHz (arriving aircraft) There is intense gliding activity in the vicinity of the airfield Instruction to report you have information Quebec

=== International Airport Example 1 ===
Sample ATIS Message from Amsterdam Schiphol

Message	Explanation
This is Schiphol arrival information Kilo	Indicates the broadcast is for aircraft inbound to Schiphol, and the bulletin's identification letter
Main landing runway one eight Right	Main runway used for landing is 18R, which indicates the direction (180 degrees magnetic) and Right implies there are other runways with a similar direction (18L (left), and perhaps others, such as 18C (center))
Transition level 50	When descending below Flight Level 50 (equivalent to 5000ft altitude on a standard barometric setting of 1013 hPa), aircraft should set their altimeter to the prevailing barometric pressure (QNH) of the airfield (given later in the ATIS)
Two zero zero degrees, one one knots	Wind direction from azimuth 200 degrees magnetic (south-southwest), average 11 knots
Visibility one zero kilometres	General visibility 10 kilometers or more
Few 1300 feet, scattered 1800 feet, broken 2200 feet	Cloud layers at the indicated altitude above the airport
Temperature one five, dewpoint one three	Temperature and dewpoint in degrees Celsius
QNH niner niner five hectopascal	QNH (barometric pressure adjusted to mean sea level) 995 hectopascal
No significant change	No significant change in weather expected
Contact Approach and Arrival callsign only	When instructed to contact the Approach and Arrival controller, check in with callsign only (for the sake of brevity)
End of information Kilo	End of bulletin, and the bulletin's identification letter again

See METAR for a more in-depth explanation of aviation weather messages and terminology.

=== Example 2 ===
This example was recorded on 11 July 2016 at London Stansted Airport during which time there were ongoing maintenance works taking place on the taxiway surface in a part of the airport near the cargo terminal; the ATIS broadcast reflects this.

Sample ATIS Message from London Stansted

Message	Explanation
Stansted information Uniform.	Indicates the broadcast is for all aircraft arriving or departing from Stansted, and the bulletin's identification letter.
Time 12:50, automatic.	The information and meteorological data was last sampled at 12:50 UTC and that the measurements were made automatically.
Runway in use 22. Runway 22 DRY DRY DRY.	Runway 22 is being used for take-offs and landings and that it has dry surface conditions in all three thirds of the runway length.
Ground is open, delivery is closed.	The ground controller frequency is open and is manned whilst the IFR clearance delivery frequency is closed and unmanned - clearance requests should be made to the ground controller.
Transition level - flight level 65.	Aircraft above Flight Level 65 (6500ft) should set their altimeters to QNH 1013. When descending below, they should set their altimeter to the local QNH given later in the ATIS.
Expect an ILS approach.	Expect the approach procedure to be the one published for Runway 22 ILS.
Surface wind 250, 14 knots.	Wind direction from azimuth 250 degrees magnetic (west-southwest) with an average windspeed of 14 knots.
Visibility 10 kilometre or more.	General visibility 10 kilometers or more.
Scattered 2400 feet, broken 4600 feet.	Cloud layers at the indicated altitude above the airport.
Cumulonimbus detected.	An observation of cumulonimbus cloud; typically associated with strong turbulence, thunderstorms and lighting; was made.
Temperature +19, dew point +14.	Temperature and dewpoint in degrees Celsius.
QNH 1007	The airport barometric pressure is 1007 hectopascal.
Work in progress in Apron Alpha - taxiway Juliet closed between Papa and Alpha.	There is maintenance work in progress in the Alpha Apron and that a nearby taxiway has been closed.
Acknowledge receipt of information Uniform and advise aircraft type on first contact.	When contacting the controller, tell them that you have made note of the details in this ATIS bulletin and give them your aircraft type.

=== Example 3 ===
This message was recorded at Manchester International Airport on the 9th of August 2019

Message	Explanation
Manchester departure information papa	Indicates the current information for all departing aircraft from Manchester
Time 1750hrs, automatic	The ATIS was last updated at 16:50 British summer time
Departure runway 23L	The runway in use for departures is 23L
Surface wind 290 9 knots	The wind direction and speed is 290 degrees at 9 knots
Visibility 10 kilometre or more	Visibility is 10 kilometres or more
No cloud detected	No clouds have been detected at the time of the ATIS update
Temperature +17, dewpoint +8	Temperature and the dewpoint in degrees Celsius
QNH 1016	Barometric pressure is 1,016 hectopascals
Increased bird activity has been reported in the vicinity of the airfield	Bird activity around the airfield has increased
Acknowledge receipt of information papa and report aircraft type on first contact with Manchester delivery	Tell the delivery controller that you have made a note of the ATIS when contacting them

== See also ==
- METAR
- Air traffic control
- Automated airport weather station
