= Colour state =

System for showing meteorological conditions

Colour states is a system used for quickly showing meteorological conditions.

Meteorological colour states are determined by the relevant worst condition from the visibility and significant cloud height. In the US and parts of Europe the lowest significant cloud layer is five or more oktas; in the United Kingdom, Belgium, France and the Netherlands it is three oktas or more. If visibility or cloud height measurements fall on a boundary (e.g. 5000 m visibility or 1500 ft cloud height) the colour state assumes the higher value in this case WHT.

If an airfield runway is unusable for reasons other than clouds or low visibility (e.g. ice or other obstructions) then the word BLACK is written in full and placed immediately before the actual colour state (e.g. BLACKWHT).

The colour state may be appended to a METAR report. A short period forecast called a TREND which covers the following two hours from the observation may also be added, often with reference to the colour state.

== Criteria ==
The following criteria are used to determine the colour state:

| Colour state | BLU | WHT | GRN | YLO1 | YLO2 | AMB | RED |
|---|---|---|---|---|---|---|---|
| Cloud height in feet | 2500 | 1500 | 700 | 500 | 300 | 200 | <200 |
| Visibility in metres | 8000 | 5000 | 3700 | 2500 | 1600 | 800 | <800 |

== See also ==
- Colour code
