= GAFOR =

Format for reporting weather info for aviation purposes

GAFOR ("General Aviation Forecast") is a format for reporting weather information for aviation purposes. The GAFOR is used in many European countries. In order to easy transmit and understand GAFOR forecasts, the original (local) names are systematically replaced by a code number. There are two kinds of application:

- In France and Germany for example the GAFOR - Code refers to regions.
- In Switzerland, Austria, Croatia and Slovenia the code refers to often used or simply usable and therefore predefined routes for crossing the country. This is a special need for the alpine or other mountainous regions, where VFR routing between mountains higher than the physical performance of pilots (oxygen) or the aircraft are common.

== GAFOR codes ==
The GAFOR gives information on weather conditions (VIS/ceiling) prevailing along the main VFR Routes in Switzerland, Austria, Croatia and Slovenia. VIS and ceiling conditions considered, four weather categories are distinguished:

- X: closed
- M: marginal
- D: difficult
- O: open

Other weather phenomena dangerous for aviation, such as icing and turbulence are forecasted in GAMET or flight forecast. For this reason they are not taken into account in GAFOR.

== Transmission of Swiss GAFOR ==
The GAFOR is spoken on magnetic disk or tape at Zurich and Geneva. The forecast enumerates weather categories in chronological order, first for groups of routes REF: 4.4.2 then for single routes REF: 4.4.3, using the ICAO spelling alphabet:

- O = OSCAR
- D = DELTA
- M = MIKE
- X = X-RAY

== GAFOR Routes (groups) in Switzerland ==
Each group is or can be divided into several distinct routes, e.g. for choosing one of different possible passes through the Alps.

Groups of routes:

- 00 Basel-Schaffhausen-Altenrhein
- 10 Genève-Grenchen-Zürich-Altenrhein
- 20 Montreux-Bern-Zürich
- 30 Spiez-Meiringen-Brünig-Goldau
- 40 Genève-Simplonpass-Lugano
- 50 Basel-Gemmipass-Sion
- 70 Zürich-Gotthardpass-Lugano
- 80 Zürich-Lukmanierpass-Biasca
- 90 Altenrhein-Julierpass-Malojapass-Lugano
- 99 Alle Routen/All routes/Tutte le rotte/Toutes les routes

== Service distribution in Switzerland ==
Meteorological information is available at the aerodromes (Selfbriefing Station). They are also available on telephone, FAX, SMS and internet.

Issue hour Validity

- 0500 UTC 0600-1200 UTC
- 0845 UTC 0900-1500 UTC
- 1145 UTC 1200-1800 UTC
- 1445 UTC 1500-2100 UTC (April to September only)
