= Okta =

Unit of measurement for quantifying cloud cover

Scale of cloud cover measured in oktas (eighths) with the meteorological symbol for each okta

In meteorology, an okta is a scale of measurement used to describe the amount of cloud cover at any given location such as a weather station. Sky conditions are estimated in terms of how many eighths of the sky are covered in cloud, ranging from 0 oktas (completely clear sky) through to 8 oktas (completely overcast). In addition, in the SYNOP code there is an extra cloud cover indicator '9' indicating that the sky is totally obscured (i.e. hidden from view), usually due to dense fog or heavy snow.

When used in weather charts, okta measurements are shown by means of graphic symbols (rather than numerals) contained within weather circles, to which are attached further symbols indicating other measured data such as wind speed and wind direction.

Although relatively straightforward to measure (visually, for instance, by using a mirror), oktas only estimate cloud cover in terms of the area of the sky covered by clouds. They do not account for cloud type or thickness, and this limits their use for estimating cloud albedo or surface solar radiation receipt.

Cloud oktas can also be measured using satellite imagery from geostationary satellites equipped with high-resolution image sensors such as Himawari-8. Similar to traditional approaches, satellite images do not account for cloud composition.

Oktas are often referenced in aviation weather forecasts and low level forecasts: SKC = Sky clear (0 oktas); FEW = Few (1 to 2 oktas); SCT = Scattered (3 to 4 oktas); BKN = Broken (5 to 7 oktas); OVC = Overcast (8 oktas); NSC = nil significant cloud; CAVOK = ceiling and visibility okay.

== Hand-drawn maps ==
Cloud-cover symbols used on weather teleprinters and aviation reports in the US

In the early 20th century, it was common for weather maps to be hand drawn. The symbols for cloud cover on these maps, like the modern symbols, were drawn inside the circle marking the position of the weather station making the measurements. Unlike the modern symbols, these ones consisted of straight lines only rather than filled in blocks which would have been less practical on a hand drawing. A reduced set of these symbols were used on teleprinters used for distributing weather information and warnings. These machines were 5-bit teleprinters using a modified version of the Baudot-Murray code.

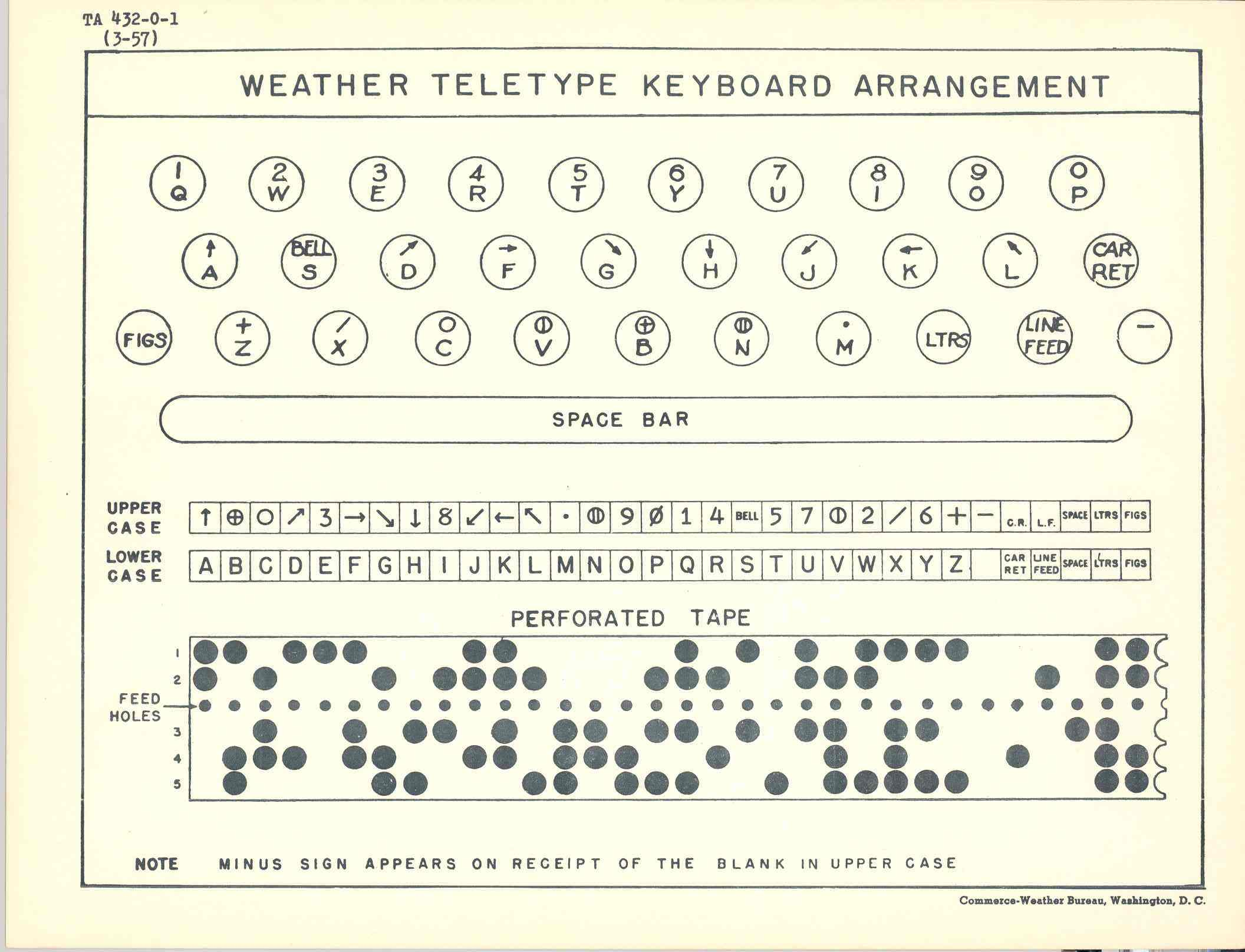
Weather teleprinter keyboard and code
