= George Meegan =

British adventurer and alternative educator

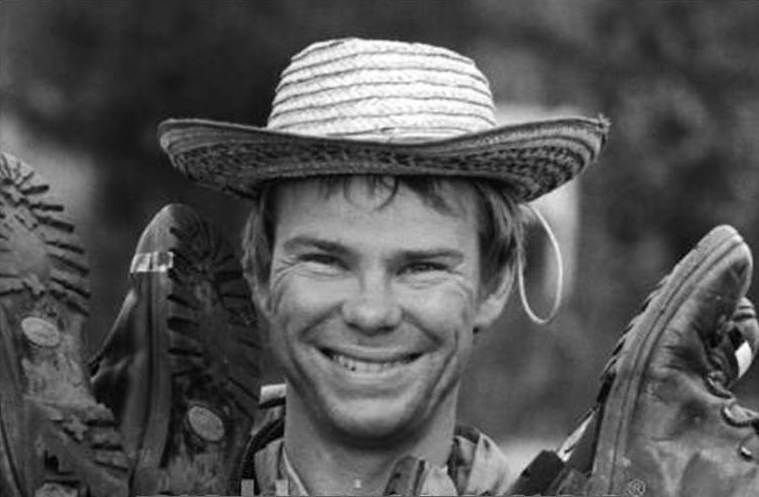
A headshot of George with the historic Boots he wore for the unbroken walk

George Meegan (2 December 1952 – 10 January 2024) was a British adventurer and alternative educator best known for his unbroken walk of the Western Hemisphere from the southern tip of South America to the northernmost part of Alaska at Prudhoe Bay. This journey was 19,019 miles (30,608 km) on foot, completed in 2,426 days (1977–1983) and is documented in his book The Longest Walk (1988). He received substantial media coverage (including appearances on the Today Show, CBS Morning News and Larry King Live) and was featured in numerous public speaking forums.

In the course of his walk and subsequent worldwide residencies, Meegan developed a profound interest in indigenous cultures; he sought innovative ways to teach native peoples how to flourish in modern technological society while retaining their language and identity. In 2014, he wrote Democracy Reaches the Kids, a book about how persons of all cultures may best learn what they truly want to know in life, naturally and joyfully, without centralized government compulsion.

== Early life ==
Shortly after George was born, his father left and his mother died from cancer. He was raised by his mother's older brother, Geoffrey Meegan, a former Royal Engineer, and Geoffrey's wife, Frieda, who was an auxiliary nurse at Keycol Hill Hospital. Legally adopted at age three, George's name was changed from Killingbeck to Meegan. He grew up in Rainham, Kent, England. At 16, he signed on as a cadet aboard the T.S. Worcester, under the Thames Nautical Training College at Greenhithe. From there he went to sea in the Merchant Navy, first, on the MV Trecarne (1970), then the other tramp freighter Hain-Nourse, which was then a part of P&O—embarking on his childhood ambition for a life of 'high adventure.'

Seafaring took him to more than 100 international ports of call, including Hong Kong, Bombay, Calcutta, Melbourne, Port Elizabeth, Cape Town, Antwerp, Dar es Salaam, and Mombasa. A crossing from Japan to Chile took over 30 days. A notable incident (during his anchorage off Lagos, Nigeria) in which Meegan played an important role—maintaining order aboard his ship, the Omar—is now called The Great Cement Scandal of 1975. Meegan's career at sea spanned six-and-a-half years, serving in eleven ships. He finished in 1976 as second mate in navigation.

== The Longest Walk ==
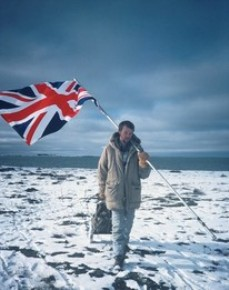
Final steps of the Longest Walk (1983)

In 1976 Meegan retired from the Merchant Navy, beginning a several-year odyssey: walking from the bottom of South America to the top of North America. He documented his journey in his self-published book The Longest Walk: The Record of Our World's First Crossing of the Entire Americas (Xlibris). According to the book, George Meegan:

- Took 41 million steps.
- Wore out 12 1/2 pairs of Italian hiking boots.
- Married his Japanese sweetheart.
- Had two children.
- Traversed the historically impassable Darién Gap, where he was shot at and survived a knifing attack unscathed.
- Visited President Jimmy Carter at his home
- Garnered 8 world records.

The book was listed in Guinness World Records.

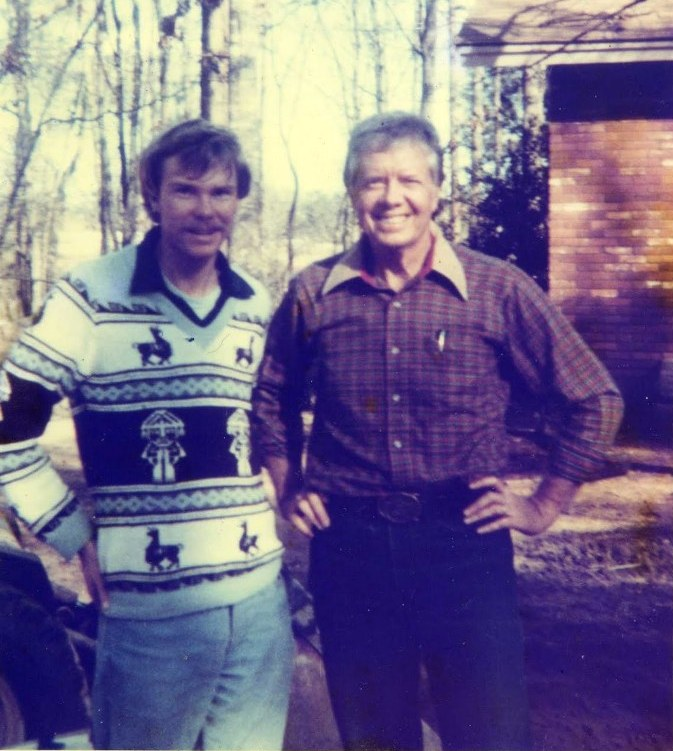
With Jimmy Carter, Plains, GA (1981)

In America, the 'world walker' was preceded in town-to-town media coverage signifying that, for many Americans, while in their country, Meegan had discovered the American Dream. In 1981, Jimmy Carter invited Meegan for a chat at the president's Plains, Georgia, home. Later that year, Meegan reached Washington, D.C., where People magazine greeted him. Friends and followers arranged several meetings with high government officials and dignitaries.

The crossing continued through the northern United States, Canada, into the Yukon, and on to the final step above the Arctic Circle. On the afternoon of 18 September 1983, he crossed a strip of tundra to the edge of the Arctic Ocean. At the age of 31, Meegan had walked 19,019 unbroken miles from end to end of two continents. Walking from Patagonia to Alaska was later done by Karl Bushby (1998 to 2006) and Holly "Cargo" Harrison (2016–18), though they did not detour to the East Coast, making their trips shorter.

=== Publication and publicity ===
From the Arctic, he returned to his home in England. Meegan held a 600,000-word handwritten manuscript of the journey that he felt was invaluable to the world. Meegan believed his feat was a historic 'first crossing'. It also carried an inspirational calling to modern youth that it was still possible to 'live your dream.' After being turned down by the major houses in London, he took a job as a courier for DHL and flew to New York City aboard the Concorde.

Door-to-door attempts to convince others to publish the manuscript failed until he met American war hero John Walker, who introduced George to Dodd, Mead and Company. However, the 199-year-old firm, after a series of non-familial corporate ownerships, later went bankrupt, so in 2008, he self-published The Longest Walk: The Record of our World's First Crossing of the Entire Americas.

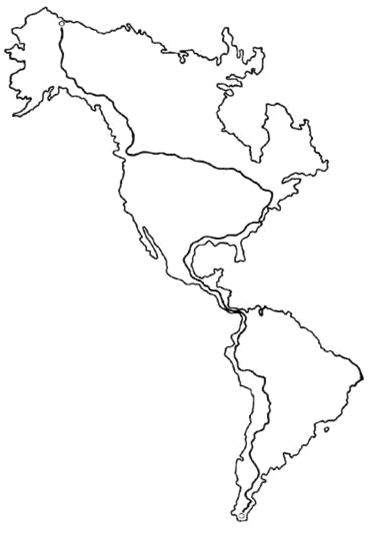
Meegan's 19,019-mile route

Paragon Press acquired the title and the book sold well, including translations in Japan and Italy. In 1988, Dodd, Mead and Co, which did the first Lewis and Clark journal, published the more familiar edition with Meegan's preferred subtitle The Longest Walk: An Odyssey of the Human Spirit.

Following the Dodd, Mead publication, strong reviews led to appearances on the Today Show, CBS Morning News, and Larry King Live. Meegan was invited back multiple times to various programs, and held dozens of TV appearances and radio broadcasts, along with hundreds of worldwide lectures—colleges, Rotary clubs, The Explorers Club of New York, Sing Sing Prison, Ghana, Italy, Japan, and the RMS (Royal Mail Ship) Queen Elizabeth. He was listed as an inspirational speaker by Sports Illustrated.

People magazine, having produced a four-page story on him in 1981, followed with a three-page feature after the 1983 finish. People editor John Drake wrote that Meegan was the most unknown Bio person they ever did. (One photographer, Peter B. Kaplan, would go on to shoot world-famous pictures of the Statue of Liberty.) Following the People publicity, New Yorker, Backpacker, Voice of America, Studs Terkel, various primetime TV interviews, and numerous newspaper articles from The New York Times to The Washington Post showcased the "witty, clean-cut globetrotter".

Having arrived in the United States from Britain via fourteen countries, Meegan's fascination with America grew during his millions of steps across it to Washington, D.C. Everyday citizens helped and cheered him. In frequent letters to notable politicians and public figures, Meegan extols the land's open space, an innate drive of its people to achieve, and the availability of the American Dream to all. "It is the national ethos of a set of ideals found nowhere else he has walked," he said. "It includes the opportunity to prosper and succeed, and an upward social mobility achieved through hard work that is available to the common man like him, an orphan, school dropout who ran away to sea."

Back in England, the Royal Geographical Society made him a fellow in 1983. Also in 1983 a newspaper competition for 'The Best Legs in UK' included Meegan. Other candidates were the captain of England's soccer team, winner of the Derby (the horse) flat race, and so on. World decathlon champion Daley Thompson won the competition, but Daley, during training from the LA 1984 Olympics, said, "George deserves it more." The shield for 'Champion Legs of Great Britain' was presented to George by Ernest Saunders, Chairman of Guinness.

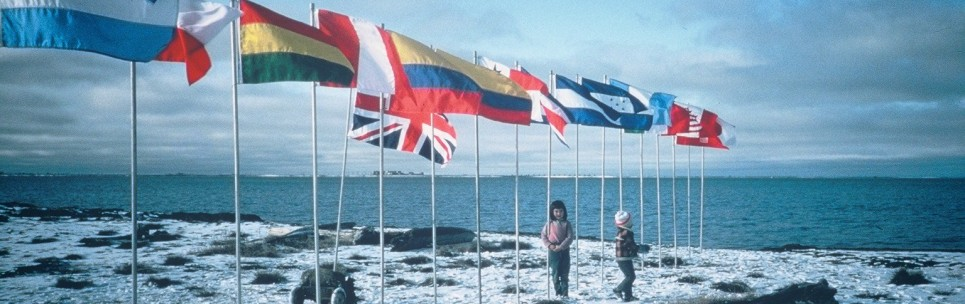
After 2,426 days, Meegan reaches the Beaufort Sea (1983)

Though he earned up to a thousand dollars for each lecture, most were free of charge and he needed to work to support himself. Throughout 1983–84, he worked in plaster, sheetrock, demolition, and cleaning, and thus was able to finance his way back to England, then to Japan.

Meegan returned again to New York in 1988 for a promotion of the new release of The Longest Walk by Dobb Mead. He also lectured in NYC and made other public appearances. Brooklyn borough president Howard Golden proclaimed George Meegan Day in Brooklyn with dancers and music. "Only in America may such a dream come true", said Meegan.

== Alaska 2000 ==
In 2000, at age 47, and 17 years after completing the 19,019-mile Longest Walk, Meegan returned to the Arctic Circle and extended his journey by walking almost 500 kilometers further, from Prudhoe Bay northwest to Barrow, Alaska. This put a finishing touch on the hike at the northernmost land point of North America. The last 14 km leg of his walk from Barrow village to Point Barrow, with windchill values reaching −83 °F (−64 °C), set his 8th Guinness record for the first crossing of the Americas by any means—whether walking, road travel, ship, or airplane.

On 23 January 2001 Meegan reached his goal – land's end of North America – with about 100 Barrow villagers and adventurers from the world, including Lt. Col. Norman D. Vaughan. The purpose of the Alaska 2000 effort was to complete the hemispheric walk and to bring hope to the indigenous world by developing an alternative educational route whereby they could maintain their endangered culture and yet be a part of the 21st century.

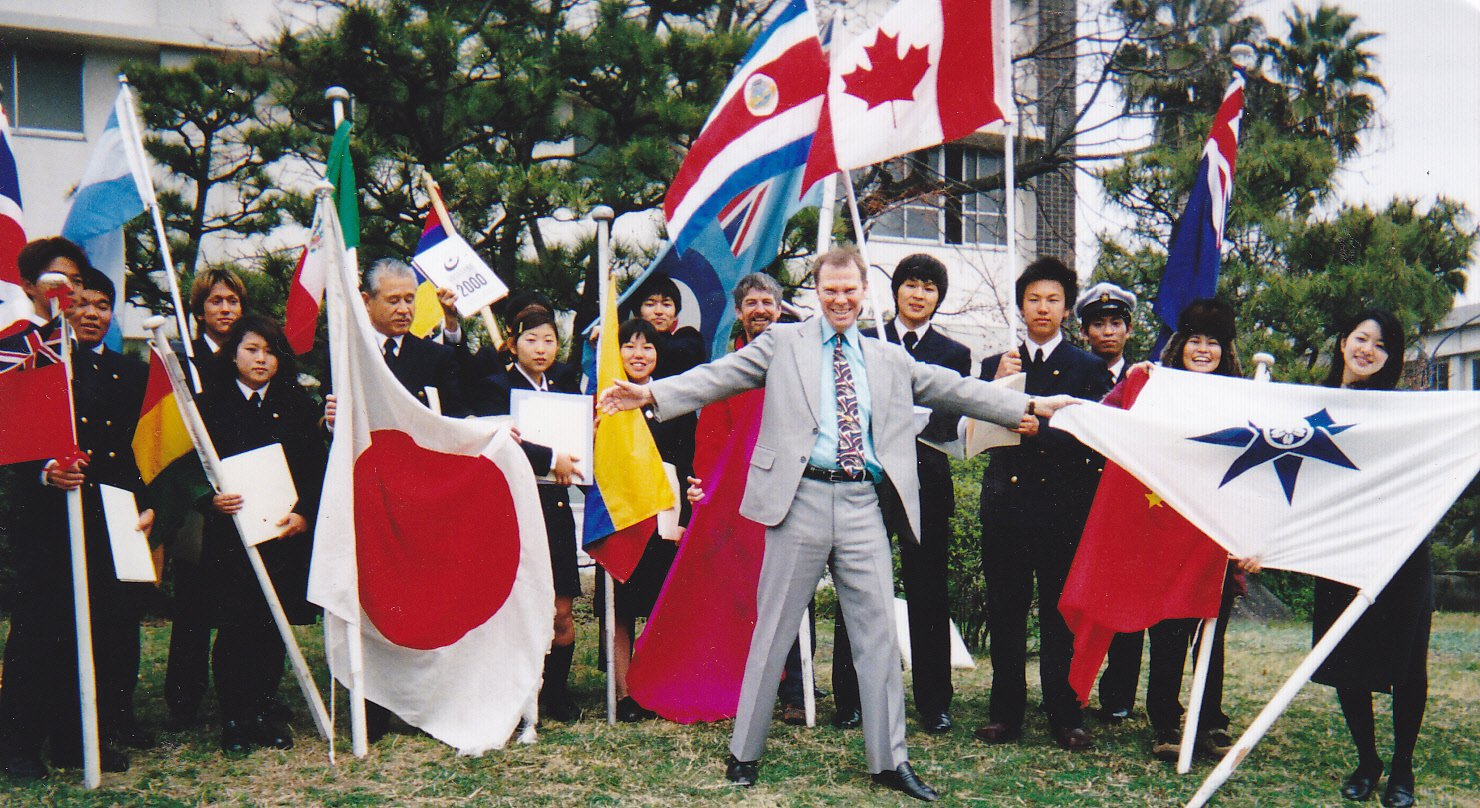
Homecoming with cadets after Alaska 2000 in Kobe, Japan

The Alaska 2000 march was delayed due to weather. Meegan's arrival at Barrow on 23 January 2001 coincided with the winter sun finally reappearing above Barrow's horizon after two months of darkness (Barrow is the northernmost settlement in the United States, at 71.29° N). Participants were encouraged to bring a flag, banner, or sign on the march. Arctic survival gear was provided and John 'Jumper' Bitters, formerly of New Zealand's elite Special Air Service, parachuted down with flags as the thirty walkers reached Jumper DZ from Point Barrow.

At this millennium event, in front of world media, the US government formally apologized to First Nations—the more than 600 Aboriginal peoples spread across Canada and Alaska who are neither Inuit nor Métis—in a public gesture unique in American history. "At Barrow on 1 January 2001, the US government via the White House and Bureau of Indian Affairs (BIA) offered sincere apology for 'the cowardly killing of woman and children'... and other atrocities spelled out in three-and-a-half pages read out loud." Legislators from both Houses of Alaska sent special personal acknowledgments as well.

The Alaska 2000 project also offered the US government a school alternative whereby—via an adjusted education—all Alaska's First Nation cultures would be revived from extinction. The basis for this cultural/language preservation effort was a model program that Meegan had written up before Alaska 2000, which he named 'Hope from the Land of the Polar Bear.'

The new program gave a route to save the threatened Aleut, Athabaskan, Inupiaq, Tlingit, Tsimshian and Yupik languages. The key, Meegan judged, was a culture-based curriculum. Teaching would be primarily in the indigenous languages, along with English (or Spanish, etc.), and accompanied by all necessary tools for successful living in the 21st century. His aim was "to prevent language extinction".

His culture-based curriculum is also called Democracy Reaches the Kids, for which the US government awarded its highest endorsement, the E11 visa. Meegan accepted the E11, an honorary citizenship from Barrow, and left Alaska with the gift of a 100-year-old sacred eagle feather.

== Democracy Reaches the Kids ==
Following Alaska 2000, Meegan returned to Japan, where he reacclimatized to professorial duties and his family. He taught in the Kobe University department of Maritime Science and lectured frequently worldwide. He also began to piece together film footage of the Alaska 2000 to produce the documentary Hope from the Land of the Polar Bear (2002). It was shown at the New York Explorers Club Film Festival. There is a copy in the Royal Geographical Society historic collection.

While educating he became educated, and began to weave the thoughts of things he had learned and accomplished in recent years into a text of school reform. Democracy Reaches the Kids was self-published in 2002 by Sirivatana Interprint of Bangkok. The two key elements of the text framework are a child's health and a child's culture—both original and adoptive. George, in the next decade, carried the slim book with him wherever he went in the hope that it might register with someone and see its revolutionary educational possibility.

As associate professor at Kobe University, George taught students to be ships' officers. He lectured widely on maritime science on topics from shipboard English to navigation, in and out of Japan. From the university he led 45 students to Alaska in 2000, and then again in 2001. After 2002, Meegan moved about the world "with a purpose," but always returned to Japan and his students until 2011.

From these worldwide journeys emerged the principles of Democracy Reaches the Kids (DRTK)—beginning with the question, "What does each individual child, at the beginning of that great challenge and adventure we call life, need to be successful in the 21st century?" The aim is for education to encompass the whole world of the childhood experience, especially for those kids who do not fit in (like Meegan himself), with holistic education. Though DRTK was never put out for public sale, George distributed them continually while resupplying from the Bangkok publisher.

DRTK proposes that environment—both local and planetary—is the key in the battle of nature and nurture. The six-month pilot program for communities includes environment, culture, health, communication, computer, and social skills, plus a bit of money management. Then the distinguishing topics: talents, inspiration, activities, dreams... inherent to each child, which modern state schooling ignores or suppresses. Meegan suggests that the framework of DRTK enables the individual to soar beyond the nation, while creating an informed and caring citizenry.

Meegan articulated his vision and challenge for the 2010s as 'pioneering the route whereby all our children can become the best they can be.'

"This goes beyond mere academics (whose second meaning is 'pointlessness'), and where the students are happier with real focus on what they see as naturally important. No more graffiti scarring. No more bullying. No more one in three kids heading for diabetes. Gifted kids getting there years before they would have otherwise. No more pressure from age 3 to… I suspect it would have nipped Columbine."

George's aforementioned unique E11 (US Alien of Extraordinary Ability) visa is the only ever issued in child education, most commonly called 'extraordinary capacity.' The US government only grants the E11 if it establishes that a green card applicant is one of the very best in his field of endeavour.

== Japan years ==
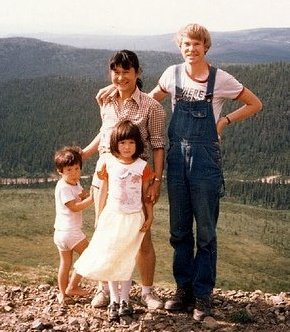
The Meegans (George, Yoshiko, w/kids Geoffrey and Ayumi), shown here at the end of the Longest Walk (1983)

Meegan lived in Kobe, Japan for most of the period between 1991 until 2010. He had met his wife, Yoshiko Matsumoto, in 1975 when he had to join a ship in Japan and so crossed from UK on the Trans-Siberian Railway. While hitchhiking to the ship in Kobe, George was picked up by Yoshiko, then they stayed in touch by mail for two years until he decided to break the long-distance hiking record held by David Kwan (18,500 miles).

As he mapped a route, he wrote about his plan to Yoshiko. She was unhappily employed in an office and trying to escape a prearranged marriage. She flew to London thinking George's trip would be by bus, and was shocked to find it was to be on foot. Nevertheless, she joined Meegan on his first step from Tierra del Fuego in 1977 with nearly 20,000 miles to go to reach the arctic.

Since neither could speak the other's language, they could not hold a conversation during the walk. Just 300 yards and Yoshiko stopped, sat down on the mud strip road, and started to cry. He proclaimed, "Don't worry, love, only another 19,000 miles to go!" Yoshiko changed her mind to continue when, shortly, an escaped convict pointed a revolver at her head. They escaped, and walked over three weeks to the Strait of Magellan, which separates Tierra del Fuego from the South American mainland.

Once across, George calculated they must cover 1,200 miles in three months or be marooned by the snows in the Argentine winter. Once on the mainland, they agreed that Yoshiko would hitchhike ahead across the desolate plateaus. Each night she pitched camp and waited, until nearing the tent in the dark, George would shine his tiny flashlight, and she hers, at each other. There was a happy reunion each night, and they fell in love all the way up to Alaska. Pausing in Mendoza, Argentina, they married.

By the completion of the Longest Walk in 1983, Yoshiko had birthed a son and daughter during timeouts in Japan, as George marched the unbroken route up the Americas. After the walk, they reunited in Toki, Gifu, where her parents lived. George taught English, like many other foreigners in Japan do, until a full Professor at Kobe University in Maritime Science told George that because of his background at the 'University of High Seas', they were bringing him to Kobe, where he became an associate professor. George had left school at age 16, so it was the only degree he ever earned. It was the first 'professor' rank granted to a non-university graduate in Japan since the Meiji Revolution of 1859.

As the book The Longest Walk took off with readership around the world, during his 17-year tenure at Kobe, Japan took the lead. It was judged 'inspirational' and is included as a segment of the Japanese national high school curriculum. The adventure has been excerpted as an elective text for Japanese universities. The book is held at the US Library of Congress, and he is pictured in the Guinness Book of World Records, Japan, Great Britain, and the United States.

Kobe is the leading national university of maritime science in Japan. As the only Westerner on faculty on the maritime side of the grounds, Meegan, 5' 10", 150 pounds and with blonde hair, stood out. He reported that the kids often told him he was the best teacher in their experience. At present, Japanese students go to study English in Portland or Disneyland. However, in George's time he took them and students from other departments on major expeditions in the Alaska Labrador, and such places that were in his real situation. The most publicized was to the Alaska 2000 event – "the most significant international adventures from Kobe U since WWII."

One of the most enduring contributions to the MS department was the creation of an abridged version of the United Nations' International Maritime Organization (IMO) benchmark Standard Marine Communication Phrases that was the bulky benchmark. His replacement title, SHIPBOARD ENGLISH for Young Seafarers, was an important step in worldwide Maritime Education and Training. The original UN IMO is a 300-page tome of maritime expressions where, by comparison, Meegan's abridged version is a more user friendly and pocket size booklet.

Meegan also authored the only example of the English language (International, Basic) that fits onto a single two-sided sheet of paper. It was called The Kobe One Page Basic English Dictionary and has 2,000 words, and was later published as Basic English One Page (VirtualBookWorm, 2013). He still uses the One-Page Dictionary during travels to teach English to non-speakers.

Throughout the 2000s, George taught, wrote, lectured, and made a documentary Hope from the Land of the Polar Bear (2002), and raised his children. During this time, Japan was awash in the phenomenon of Hikikomori, which literally means 'shutting out the sun.' With his own children in the midst of peer pressure to withdraw, Meegan fought back with a written abstract titled "Hikikomori: New Approach of Hope" dealing with the country adolescents pulling inward by seeking extreme degrees of isolation.

He noted that Hikikomori is not just a condition of Japan, though in sheer numbers it leads, but is growing throughout the world. Similar problems are emerging in his own Great Britain and the Asian tigers of Hong Kong and South Korea. Then, in a follow-up paper "A Blueprint for a Way Forward," he summarized his solution. He would set up a program to harness the power of youth and youth dreams, to haul them out, step by step, from the darkness. The program would be a trajectory to educate, good citizenship, and a happier life. He spoke of the flattened lives being pulled up by the principles of Democracy Reaches the Kids. It is a simple alternative curriculum whereby the kids who don't fit in are given a clear alternative route through education, and to success in society.

Both children grew up in Japan and became bilingual. Geoffrey left at thirteen to attend the famous alternative Summerhill School under head Zoe Readhead in Suffolk, England. The Summerhill philosophy embraced Meegan's own that children learn best with freedom from concern and a strong voice in the classroom. Lessons are optional, and pupils are free to choose what to do with their time. The function of the school is to encourage a child to live his own life, rather than a life according to the purpose of an educator. Geoffrey also studied martial arts, was known for his sense of humor, and led his father's 44 Japanese students in Barrow at the Alaska 2000.

Daughter Ayumi, which literally means 'walking' in Japanese, was a scholar, and liked jazz. After graduating high school in Kobe, she moved to San Francisco and performed jazz, travelling also to perform. She sang *The Star-Spangled Banner" in front of 2000 people, plus VIPs, at the annual dinner and press conference for her father hosted by the Explorers at the NY Waldorf Astoria Hotel.

George Meegan's position as assistant professor at the Japan Marine University in Kobe ended in 2011. There was a retirement ceremony and display of his photo record of eighteen years on faculty. The forty plus albums of his time are currently held at the Kobe University Archive. This has not been done for any faculty member before or since, and Meegan attributes the honour to the special activities he did with students at and away from campus. The sweeping record promotes him, as well as the university.

Free from teaching, Meegan sought a change from the safe urban geographic and Cultural Landscapes of Japan. While his family stayed on in Japan, and later England, George set off for new horizons. The first stop was Bethel, Alaska. Bethel, in central Alaska, 400 miles west of Anchorage has access only by air and the Kuskokwim River. It is the main port and transportation hub for 58 villages on the Yukon–Kuskokwim Delta.

Ten years earlier, in 1990, George and son Geoffrey had slept behind the couch of an old friend in Barrow named Rex Wilhelm who had since become president of the historic Alaska Commercial. George told Mr. Wilhelm about the destruction of the Eyak culture, and how he could stop it and other such tragedies. Wilhelm immediately suggested Bethel. He gave George a job as a shoe clerk 'grade 3' at his Bethel shoe store from Christmas 2011 to Christmas 2012 that paid him to reach Ecuador in early 2013 and attempt to launch Operation Safeguard to save the indigenous languages of Amazonia.

He left with a deep regard for the Bethel community, which he calls the capital of Yupik America. He has many friends, and claims they always return there to be among the friendliest people he has met in the world. It was in Bethel, in 2012, while in good health, that he selected his burial plot. This came about when Mike Calvetti, commander of the Bethel VFW, was shown Meegan's Merchant Navy (UK) Association service medal, allowing him as a member of a VFW sister organization to be buried in the cemetery with Bethel villagers.

== Politics ==
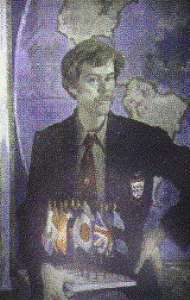
Pena portrait at NY Explorers Club (1988)

During his last year of teaching in Japan, Meegan took his university leave to England and ran for the UK Parliament. Using Democracy Reaches the Kids as a platform, Meegan ran for 2010 general election as a non-political Independent by gathering 109 personal votes for the constituency of Gillingham and Rainham, where he grew up as boy. It is more accurate to say he bicycled rather than ran for office:

"All a wonderful adventure; and yes, I stood in the General Election for where I grew-up as a boy! As I only had a week to campaign, beforehand, I specially set-up a YouTube presence, some three dozen clips for the connected generation. Right from the start, there was a bit more of a buzz whenever this unlikely candidate spoke. 'MEEGAN' was printed on the ballot paper, right next to a symbol of Rochester Castle. Of course, I had no chance of winning. I was going head-head with all of England's political machines."

"Gillingham & Rainham is a key marginal, and right from Day One, the prime minister was there, pacing edgily up and down Gillingham Station. His candidate was Paul Clark, a Labour Party minister. The thuggish BNP (British National Party) were there too; I asked them to join me. 'Walk with the angels', I said. On a borrowed bike, I had cycled 180-miles and in the process spoke to over 4,000 people. Courtesy of Royal Mail, my poster was delivered free of charge into each of the 41,000 households that make up the constituency. On the final day (5 May), I blitzed a marathon by visiting each of our 35 polling stations There, I saluted the election staffs; 'On behalf of all the candidates,' I announced. 'Thank you for your long day and your support of Democracy, and indeed your celebration of Freedom'.

"I was liable alone in all GB in doing this salute. All this relentless activity from dawn to dusk lifted the voter turnout to near 63%. Wonderful! Alone among candidates 109 votes were counted in the big hall. 'All friends', I was told. 'Your spirit shines through, George', said the former mayor of Medway. What an incredible blast it all was. A great honour in my life! The way to defend UK culture is not xenophobia, but adjust the educational system to protect it. What a lot of fun! My slogan was – If we do not lean toward our children's talent, and their dreams, they will lean toward our... nightmares."

He got involved with politics in the United Kingdom after observing what had happened with his own kids growing up in Japan and the UK. One day in Japan, Meegan's boy, Geoffrey, was in tears because the school was telling him "how bad he was." So, his father resolved to find a way so that all students could be happy and proud for whom they are. He imagined a world where all children could have their uniqueness, and what they can do be celebrated, rather than being judged and life blighted by what they cannot do. Democracy equals no more children made unhappy by school, ever. He wrote, "This is what I fight for every single day of my life remaining."

Meegan's roll into politics started in the northernmost cabin in the United States at Helmericks, on the Colville River (Alaska). He took Geoffrey there in 1990, away from the constrained Japanese classrooms, for a fresh perspective on life. Helmericks is a family homestead village, and the two Meegans increased the town population for by 30% from 6 to 8 people during a one-month stay. His son helped Meegan organize the notes for Democracy Reaches the Kids, and the book was published later that year. One of its earliest supporters was celebrated NY teacher John Taylor Gatto, who used notes from Meegan's book and carried them protected in laminations with him during his lecture days.

As for politics, Meegan believes that education shouldn't actually have any connection with politics, as would be with democracy kids. In democratic classrooms that would be the case. Each kid would have a framework, as President Clinton said, "to become the best that they can be." Letter canvassing to the general public followed the book publication, and especially to select dignitaries. In a letter to the public titled "Democracy Reaches the Kids!" (2009), the author outlined his plan to Save the Children, and therefore to change the planet:

"My vision is to gather together kids who have been lost to education and use this bottom level group, one of whom none in education can doubt that they have 'failed'. Bring them back. Use their natural enthusiasm, largely lost in modern education. All will be filmed and recorded to make the worldwide model. Local media will be sought to ensure the community are involved, fully appraised. "Education today has become a process that is consumed in testing, grading, etc. And even that is on a narrow range of subjects that have no traction what-so-ever to an angry, dangerous youth. The essence of Democracy Reaches the Kids measures and judges what a youth can do; not block and in effect destroy that youth by what he cannot do... There are a group of children in Great Britain who are called Refusers. You are not alone. In Japan some estimates say nearly one million, as you refuse."

Meegan's personal letters to public figures to drum up support for educational reform were buttressed by facts, dusted with Shakespearean charm, and always accompanied by a 'cheerio' goodbye. He wrote in a 2011 campaign letter to US Congresswoman Gabby Giffords: "USA: best miracle medicine in the whole wide world. Bravo America!" In another letter to Captain Mark Kelly USN, Astronaut, he proudly featured his E11 visa, "I have been judged at the highest US peer review level, and my deep regard of America is well known."

== Later Years ==
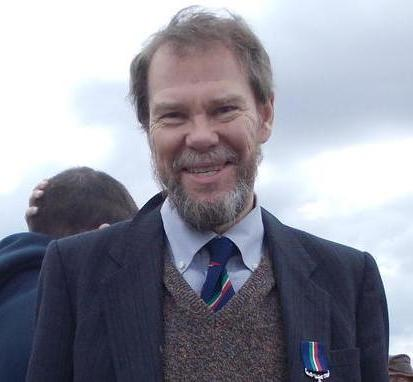
Meegan in Bethel, Alaska, Veterans Day 2012, wearing Merchant Navy Service Medal

In 2013, Meegan set off for South America to search for a locale to apply the tenets of Democracy Reaches the Kids. He took his text and scrapbook to describe a kickstart program for all the indigenous tribes of Amazonia. The pilot project aims to teach the kids what they need know to live in the modern world while keeping their culture intact. The six-month program will be filmed inside the classroom and, once completed, Meegan will incorporate the footage into a documentary. The objective is to seed Democracy Reaches the Kids to educational institutions around the world via YouTube.

The search for a site in 2013 targeted the Amazonia mountain village of Puyo, the capital of Pastaza Province. In June 2013, Meegan flew from his annual swing in the United States (to sanction the E11 visa), and on to the Ecuador capital of Quito. He saw a colour picture in the Visiones newspaper of a Waorani with seven spears pushed through him. Studying the photo and reading the report, Meegan thought that these people needed his help. The story was heralded as Puyo, so there he went on a five-hour bus to the jungled mountainside town of 27,000, including many Waorani tribe.

The Waorani or Huaorani, also known as the Waos, are Native Americans of the Amazonian who have marked differences, such as language, culture, and a deep identification with the Jaguar, from other ethnic groups from Ecuador. In the last 40 years, they have shifted from a hunting and gathering society to live mostly in permanent forest settlements such as Puyo. [According to myth, the Waorani are the descendants of a mating between a jaguar and an eagle. In their belief system, a jaguar shaman is able 'to become' a jaguar.]

The store of botanical knowledge among the tribe is extensive, ranging from poisons to hallucinogens. In 1956, a group of five American missionaries made contact with the Huaorani in what was known as Operation Auca, in which they lowered gifts in a basket from a plane to initiate friendly contact. Two days later, all five of the missionaries were killed in a Huaorani spearing raid. Meegan, aware of the precedent spearing where he was going, was more alarmed by the nation's bureaucratic indecision. Despite Quito media reports of other alleged Huaorani attacks, Meegan made his visit.

Meegan calls his pilot program "Operation Safeguard: Hope to the Indigenous Tribes of Amazonia". On arrival in Puyo, he arranged meetings among the tribe and on 6 June 2013, presented a lecture called "Stealing the Fire" to the Quito Ministry of Higher Education. It was applauded and put him into the familiar Ecuador 'slow roll' of bureaucratic promises with delays. Then, on 17 September 2013, in a speech titled "Save the Indigenous Children of Ecuador" to Puyo teachers and Waorani, he explained that the Constitution of Ecuador "Guarantees the Nationalities of the indigenous tribes, however the education policy (as is common throughout the world) cannot support that guarantee."

The aim in Puyo is to better the world through the children, primarily by preserving their indigenous languages and teaching them the lessons for living in modern times. This is designed after a successful model he set up in Barrow following the Alaska 2000 event and subsequent US government aid. Operation Safeguard in Ecuador is based on what he calls Preventable Language Extinction. In Alaska, after the 2008 loss of Eyak when the last native speaker died, no action had yet been taken to check this fast approaching extinction of several other Alaska First Nation languages.

With a similar threat among the Amazonian tribes, Meegan suggests that the only thing left to stem the demise of the tribes is a shift to a culture based curriculum. The foundation of culture is languages, and these would be defended in courses taught in the native tongues. Other classroom focuses would include environment, social, computer, Spanish, and requirements for modern living. The syllabus is outlined in Democracy Reaches the Kids.

At age 14, Meegan's son, Geoffrey, and his sister set out to walk across India from Bombay to Madras. During the 5-month trip, Ayumi became friends with Mother Teresa. She wrote Santa Pont'a Journey (2009) in English and Japanese about a young boy who embarks on foot in search to find God. In 2013, in London, Geoffrey was diagnosed with Parkinson's, and currently lives in London with the help of his family. Meegan, in Ecuador, awaits a decision from the Ministry of Education so to begin his work among the peoples he first met 35 years before.

== Death ==
Meegan died at the age of 71 on the morning of 10 January 2024, in Blackburn Royal Hospital, UK. (Aspiration pneumonia, underlying condition was Alzheimer's.)

== Books ==
- The Longest Walk – Odyssey of the Human Spirit, Dodd, Mead, 1988, 403 pp. Trade paperback by Paragon House. Translations into Japanese and Italian
- The Longest Walk: The Record of our World's First Crossing of the Entire Americas, Xlibris, 1983, 382 pp.
- Kodansha: The Optimistic Adventure, by Yoshiko Matsumoto with George Meegan. Asahi Press, 126 pp.
- Longest Walk: University textbook compiled by Professor Itsuo Oishi and George Meegan, (Used at high schools throughout Japan, inclusion in US national Social Studies textbook, Latin America, Hungary, and Canada)
- Hope from the Land of the Polar Bear, A & C Publishing, Anchorage, A & C Publishing, Anchorage, Alaska, 2000, 282 pp.
- Democracy Reaches the Kids, George Meegan, Sirivatana Interprint, Bangkok, 2002, 176 pp. Second Edition Free Man Publisher, 2013
- Kobe Port Control Inspectors (Japan) course and syllabus – created and led
- Basic English One Page, George Meegan, VirtualBookWorm of Houston, 2013
- George Meegan: The Longest Walk Companion, A Biography, with Steve Keeley, Free Man Publishing, 2013
- The Longest Walk: The Record of our World's First Crossing of the Entire Americas, Third Edition, 2013, Free Man Publishing

== Historical links ==
As pertaining to Americas, there are three others. These are the only antecedents to the George Meegan journey, and without official support:

- Vasco Núñez de Balboa – The first crossing Atlantic to Pacific across the Isthmus of Panama at Darien (1475–1517) (beheaded)
- Francisco de Orellana – Pacific to Atlantic, over the Andes and rafting down the Amazon (1541)
- Sir Alexander Mackenzie – across North America, Canada's Atlantic territories to the Pacific side of British Columbia (1793)
