= Illusion of free choice =

Illusion of free choice may refer to:

- Illusionism (free will) – Metaphysical theory
- Illusion of control – False belief in an ability to control events
- Hobson's choice – Free choice in which only one option is actually offered

== See also ==
- False dilemma – Informal fallacy involving falsely limited alternatives
- Freedom of choice (disambiguation)
- Free Will (disambiguation)
