= MarTEL =

Standardised test of maritime English language proficiency

MarTEL (Maritime Tests of English Language) is a standardised test of maritime English language proficiency, through an interactive online learning platform. It was created under the European Union's Leonardo da Vinci (European Union programme) funding stream, in combination with the Lifelong Learning Programme, and was established in 2007.

MarTEL has three grades, with the key aim to develop a series of Maritime English language standards incorporating the International Maritime Organization's (IMO) Standard Marine Communication Phrases (SMCP) at different standards:

== Background ==
Shipping is an integral part of the world economy, and yet safety at sea is still not viewed as a priority. 80% of accidents at sea are in some way caused by human error and just under half of those are caused by poor levels of maritime English language.

The language of the sea is English and many ships, and to a lesser extent, ports, are crewed by a multinational workforce. Hence, good communication in Maritime English is essential for creation and maintenance of effective working environments and safety of the crew, and generally safety at sea and at ports.

The MarTEL Project complements the Loginovsky Report which stated that the significance of English as the working language of the international shipping industry and the overall performance and safety of the international fleet depends on the skill to apply it correctly. The Report continued that the ability of a non-native speaker to have a good command of Maritime English is very much influenced by the ability to think in it, in the frame work of the maritime profession. He concludes that to make the teaching and learning processes more effective, it is required to increase the thought activity of a seafarer using English.

== The Founders ==
The founding partnership is composed of major education and training centres in six EU member states supported by their awarding, accrediting and certification authorities. The project was developed jointly with several industrial and commercial organisations in six partner countries. There are eight active, and many silent partners as well as two major awarding/validating bodies

== See also ==
- Test of English for Aviation
- International Civil Aviation Organization (ICAO)
- International Maritime Organization's (IMO)
- Standard Marine Communication Phrases (SMCP) which is the recognised standard of Maritime English, authorised by the IMO
