= Seaspeak =

Controlled natural language

Seaspeak is a controlled natural language (CNL) based on English, designed to facilitate communication between ships whose captains' native tongues differ. It has now been formalised as Standard Marine Communication Phrases (SMCP).

While generally based on the English language, seaspeak has a very small vocabulary, and will incorporate foreign words where English does not have a suitable word.

There are other similar special-purpose CNLs, including aviation English for aircraft, and the English–French hybrid PoliceSpeak for safety administration of the Channel Tunnel.

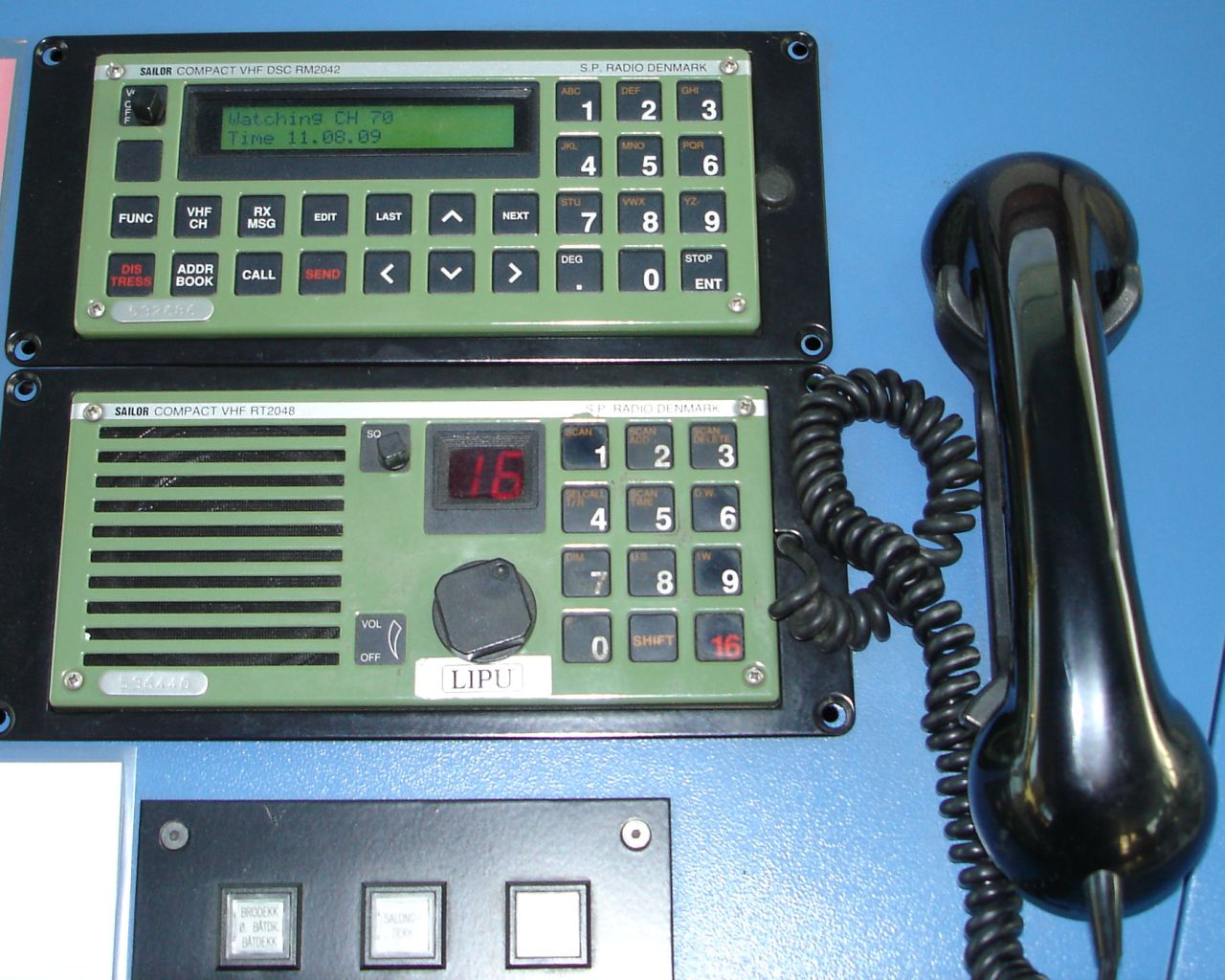
A VHF set and a VHF channel 70 DSC set, the DSC on top

== History ==
Seaspeak originated at the International Maritime Lecturers Association (IMLA) Workshop on Maritime English in 1985 in La Spezia (WOME 3), in a project led by Captain Fred Weeks, and was updated in the following years.

After the MS Scandinavian Star disaster in 1990, in which communication errors played a part, an effort was made by the International Maritime Organization to update Seaspeak and the Standard Maritime Communication Vocabulary (SMCV). This resulted in the development of the Standard Marine Communication Phrases (SMCP), which were adopted by the IMO as resolution A.918(22) in November 2001 at their 22nd Assembly.

== Example phrase "Say again" ==
A good example of the benefit of seaspeak is the use of a single short and carefully crafted phrase to replace a multitude of phrases. Thus the phrase "say again" could replace any of the following:

- Could not hear what you said, please repeat!
- I did not understand, say that again.
- Too much noise, repeat what you said!
- I am having difficulty hearing what you are saying! Please repeat what you were trying to say.
- There is too much noise on the line – I cannot understand you.
- What did you say?

A simplified vocabulary also helps overcome static, since the phrase "say again" is always two words and three syllables, no matter how much it is blurred by that static.

== See also ==
- Basic English
- Mediterranean Lingua Franca
- Number of words in English
- NATO alphabet
