= Free to Choose =

Free to Choose may refer to:

- Free to Choose (book), a 1980 book Milton and Rose Friedman
- Free to Choose (TV series), 1980 TV series broadcast by PBS that accompanied the book
- Free to Choose Network, a libertarian nonprofit corporation based in Erie, Pennsylvania

== See also ==
- Freedom of choice (disambiguation)
