= Free Will (disambiguation) =

Free will is the ability of agents to make choices unconstrained by certain factors.

Free Will may also refer to:

- Free-Will, a Japanese independent record label
- Free Will (Gil Scott-Heron album) (1972)
- Free Will (Freeway album) (2016)
- "Freewill" (song), a 1980 song by Rush
- Free Will (book), a 2012 book by Sam Harris
- "Free Will" (Young Americans), a 2000 television episode
- The Free Will or Der freie Wille, a 2006 film

The related term Freedom of the Will may also refer to:

- De libero arbitrio voluntatis, or On the Free Choice of the Will, a 388–395 three volume book by Augustine of Hippo
- De libero arbitrio diatribe sive collatio, or On Free Will or On the Freedom of the Will, a 1524 book by Erasmus
- The Freedom of the Will, a 1745 book by Jonathan Edwards
- On the Freedom of the Will, an 1836 essay by Arthur Schopenhauer
- The Freedom of the Will, a 1958 book by Austin Farrer
- The Freedom of the Will, a 1970 book by J.R. Lucas
- Freedom of the Will: a Conditional Analysis, a 2010 book by Ferenc Huoranszki

== See also ==
- FreeWill, software company for charitable donations
- Free will in theology
- Free will theorem
- Freedom of choice
- Karma
- Neuroscience of free will
- Theodicy and the Bible § Bible and free will theodicy
- Volition (psychology)
- Will (philosophy)
- Will (sociology)
