= Freedom of choice (disambiguation) =

Freedom of choice is an individual's opportunity and autonomy to perform a chosen action unconstrained by external parties.

Freedom of choice may also refer to:

- Free will, the ability to choose between different possible courses of action unimpeded
- Freedom of Choice (album), a 1980 album by Devo
  - "Freedom of Choice" (song)
- Freedom of Choice (schools), a number of plans developed in the United States, 1965–1970
- Freedom of Choice Act, an American legislative abortion rights proposal

== See also ==
- Free Will (disambiguation)
- Free to Choose
- Freedom (disambiguation)
