= FreeWill =

Online legal service company

FreeWill Co is a company whose website, FreeWill.com, has online software which helps people write wills for free and make charitable contributions, and it reports each person's planned bequests to charities which pay subscription fees. It also helps people write advance healthcare directives and living trusts in California.

== Background ==
FreeWill is a public benefit corporation founded at Stanford University in 2017 by Jennifer Xia Spradling and Patrick Schmitt. It has two social missions: The first is to create access to estate planning for all individuals regardless of their backgrounds or ability to pay. The second is to make it easy for people to leave money to charity. As a public benefit corporation, they are legally obligated to pursue their social missions in addition to seeking financial return.

The idea originated from Schmitt's work with the Democratic National Committee in fundraising. After working on his own estate planning, he figured that a website could be created that could simplify the process and that doing so could help raise money for charitable causes.

Town & Country magazine ranked the founding of FreeWill as one of the top 50 Philanthropic efforts of 2019.

== Business model ==
Charities pay a fee to FreeWill to have the charity's name included in the software, and they receive reports of the name, address, assets, and planned bequest for each donor who agrees. Donors are not required to leave money to charity.

The company's products include wills, durable financial power of attorney, qualified charitable distributions, stock donations. and living wills (also known as advance healthcare directives or healthcare power of attorney). FreeWill offers a living trust only in California.

After entering all will information, users have options to download the will, get more information, or see a lawyer, in which case the site offers the American Bar Association directory of all lawyers.

== Market ==
As of June 2021, 295,000 people have prepared wills on the platform, 19% have included bequests to charities, and bequests average $111,000. The planned bequests total $3 billion. The largest numbers of donations have been for the American Red Cross, United Way, Defenders of Wildlife and Disabled American Veterans. The average user is 57 years old.

== Privacy ==
FreeWill is not a law firm and does not have an attorney-client relationship with customers. Privacy statements let the company store information on assets, children bequests, medical and religious preferences and use them to target ads and fundraising appeals.

FreeWill says it uses modern security protocols. They acknowledge that information can escape in security breaches, for which they do not accept liability.

== Dispute resolution ==
FreeWill disclaims liability for errors and omissions in their software; they also note that laws change rapidly. If people nevertheless have disputes with the company, the users and company agree to use small claims courts or individual arbitration in New York City under "Commercial Arbitration Rules that contemplate in-person hearings." The company's offices are in New York City, and it is incorporated in Delaware.
