= Standard Marine Communication Phrases =

Set of phrases in English for use at sea

The Standard Marine Communication Phrases (SMCP) is a set of key phrases in the English language (which is the internationally recognised language of the sea), supported by the international community for use at sea and developed by the International Maritime Organization (IMO). They aim to explain: 1) external communication phrases – ship to ship and ship to shore communication, 2) onboard communication phrases – communication within the ship.

== Background ==
The SMCP were adopted by the 22nd Assembly of the IMO in November 2001 in a resolution which also promoted the wide circulation of the SMCP to all prospective users and all maritime education authorities.

The SMCP includes phrases which have been developed to cover the most important safety-related fields of verbal shore-to-ship (and vice versa), ship-to-ship and on-board communications. The aim is to reduce the problem of language barriers at sea and avoid misunderstandings which can cause accidents.

== Examples ==
- To describe an unmanned and abandoned ship floating adrift, the SMCP gives the correct phrase as, “unlit derelict vessel adrift in vicinity (date, time and position if known)”
- Being stuck in ice and requesting assistance: “I am fast in ice. I require assistance”.
- Damage to vessel by ice: “I have developed stability problems, heavy icing. Request ice breaker assistance”.
- Ship is sinking: “I am sinking. Please proceed to my assistance. What is your ETA at our distress position?”

== See also ==
- List of international common standards
- MarTEL (Maritime Tests of English Language) is a standardised test of maritime English language proficiency
- Seaspeak
- Q codes
