= SCR-299 =

The SCR-299 was a U.S. Signal Corps mobile military communications unit used during World War II.

CCKW truck shelter-mounted version of the SCR-299, the SCR-399

== History ==
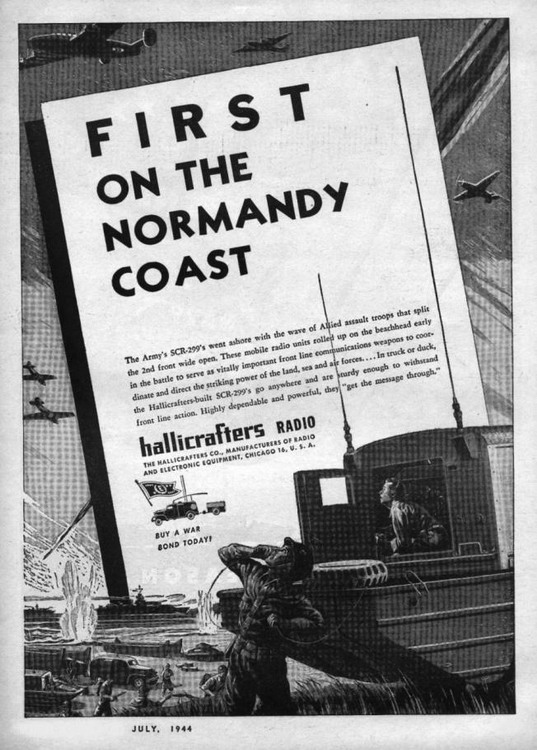
Hallicrafters SCR-299 ad c. 1944, depicting DUKW mounted SCR-399 version

The SCR-299 "mobile communications unit" was developed to provide long-range communications during World War II. The US Military sought improvements of range, flexibility and durability over its existing SCR-197 and SCR-597 transmitters. In 1942, Hallicrafters Standard HT-4 was selected as the SCR-299's transmitter, known subsequently by its military designation as the BC-610. The SCR-299 was first used on 8 November 1942 during Operation TORCH involving companies of the 829th Signal Service Battalion establishing a radio net that could exchange messages between beach-landed forces and bases in Gibraltar. Despite initial problems unloading the sets from convoy ships, the SCR-299s served until the installation of permanent Army Command and Administrative Network stations. According to US Army military historians, "General Dwight Eisenhower credited the SCR-299 in his successful reorganization of the American forces and final defeat of the Nazis at Kasserine Pass."

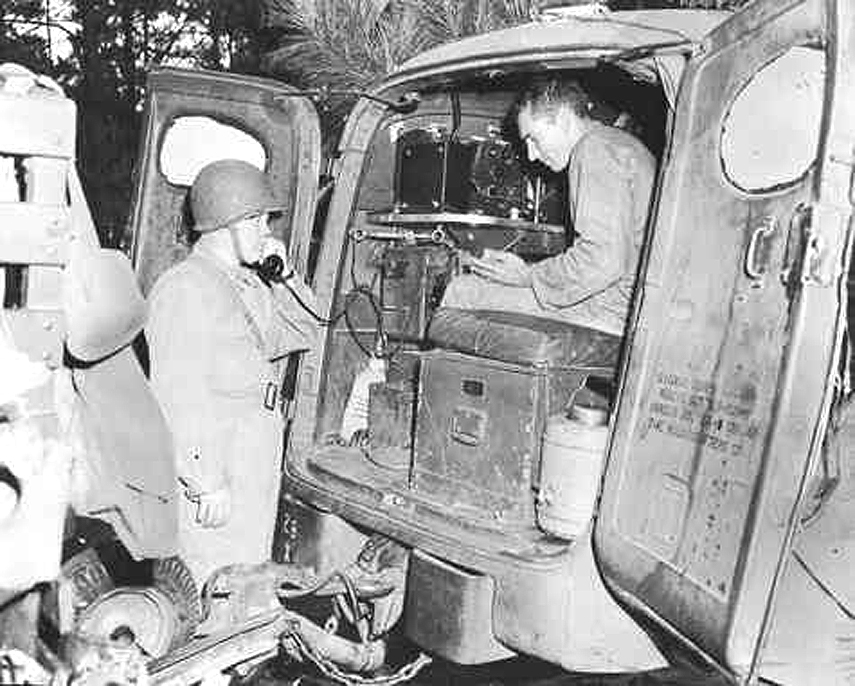
SCR-299 housed in K-51 panel van

The range of the SCR-299 exceeded original specifications, sometime establishing contact over 2,300 miles (3,700 km).

The SCR-299 provided reliable communications with England during the North African campaign, and in Normandy on D-Day, served as a connection between two airborne divisions with Britain. The SCR-299 was also used in the invasion of Sicily and the Allied invasion of Italy.

War correspondents and press reporters frequently made use of the SCR-299 and SCR-399. Access to the sets was provided to them by US Second Army and US Third Army Group Communications Teams, and in one instance, the SCR-399 became the only means of getting press copy direct to London.

In 1944, a short subject film was produced by the Jam Handy Organization and sponsored by the Hallicrafters Company that showed the construction of the SCR-299 and dramatized its use during World War II.

Hallicrafters Company advertising of the period sometimes used illustrations of the shelter-mounted SCR-399 to describe the achievements of the SCR-299.

== Specifications ==
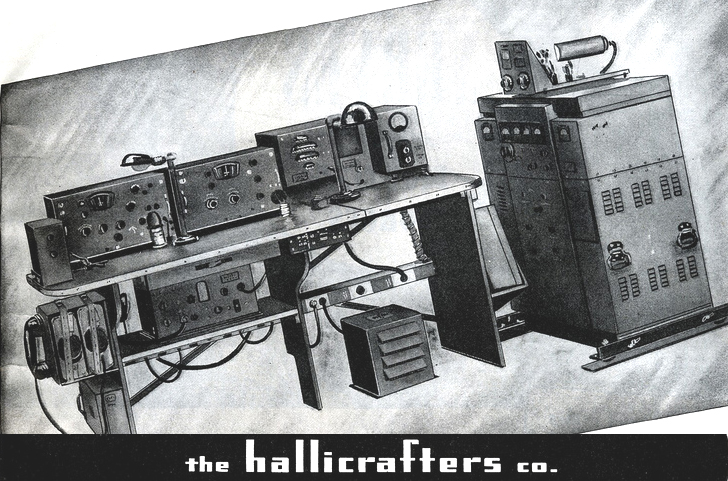
SCR-299 interior operators desk and gear, from Hallicrafters ad, 1942

- Transmitter: BC-610 plus BC-614 (speech amplifier), BC-729 (tuning unit) and BC-211 (frequency meter)
- Transmitter output power: 350 watts.
- Receivers: BC-312 and BC-342
- Frequency coverage: HF from 2 to 8 MHz (and 1–18 MHz using conversion kits)
- Power supply: 2000 watts, with additional 1500 watts for heater and lights supplied by PE-95 (power unit) on K-52 "Ben-Hur" style trailer. Optional 12 volt storage battery, or 115 volt 60 cycle AC commercial power and two spare 6 volt storage batteries
- SCR-299 housing: K-51 van truck
- SCR-399 housing: HO-17 shelter mountable on 2 1/2-ton trucks.
- SCR-499 housing: air-transportable
- Frequency Conversion Kit MC-503: coverage down to 1 MHz.
- Frequency Conversion Kit MC-516: coverage to 12 MHz
- Frequency Conversion Kit MC-517: coverage to 18 MHz.
- Antennas: 9-foot (2.7 m) whip antenna (receiver), 15-foot (4.6 m) whip antenna (transmitter). Optional 21 ft (6.4 m) whip antenna while stationary or 45 ft (14 m) auxiliary wire antenna for 2.0 to 4.5 MHz coverage.
- Remote control: field telephones, control boxes and cable.

== See also ==
- ARC-5
- BC-348
- BC-654
- BC-610
- Collins Radio
- Hallicrafters SX-28
- M-209
- R-390A
- SCR-300
- SCR-536
- Signal Corps Radio
- Wireless Set No. 19
- List of U.S. Signal Corps Vehicles
