= SCR-300 =

US military portable radio transceiver

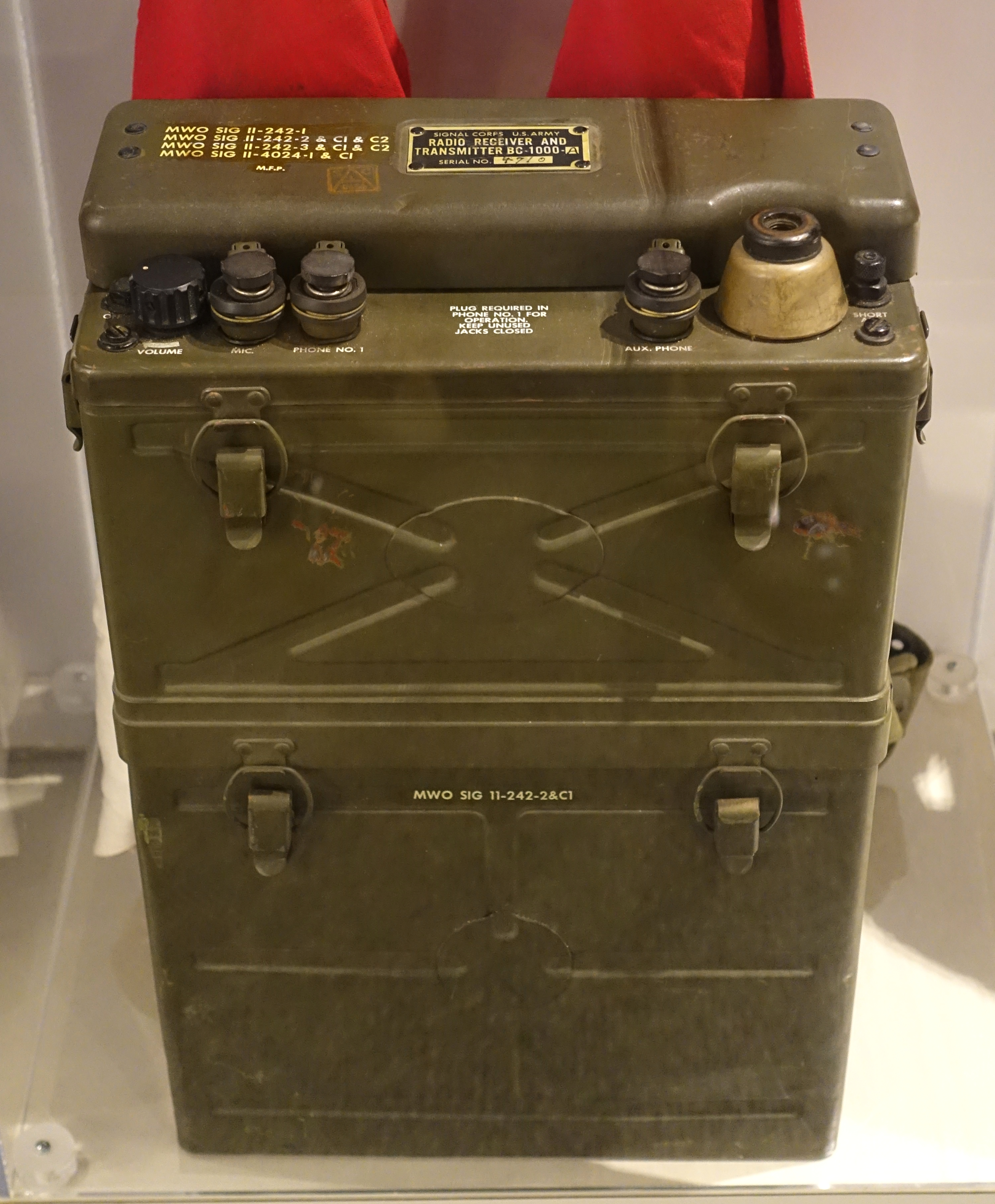
Motorola SCR-300 circa 1940

The SCR-300, designated AN/VRC-3 under the Joint Electronics Type Designation System, was a portable frequency modulated (FM) radio transceiver used by US Signal Corps in World War II. This backpack-mounted unit was the first radio to be nicknamed a "walkie talkie".

== History ==
In 1940, Motorola (then the Galvin Manufacturing Company) received a contract from the War Department to develop a portable, battery powered voice radio receiver/transmitter for field use by infantry units. The project engineering team consisted of Daniel E. Noble, who conceived of the design using frequency modulation, Henryk Magnuski who was the principal RF engineer, Marion Bond, Lloyd Morris, and Bill Vogel. The SCR-300 operated in the 40.0 to 48.0 MHz frequency range, and was channelized. Along with other mobile FM tank and artillery radios such as the SCR-508 (20.0 to 27.9 MHz) and the SCR-608 (27.0 to 38.9 MHz), the SCR-300 marked the beginning of the transition of combat-net radio from low-HF (high frequency) AM/CW (amplitude modulated/ continuous wave) to low-VHF (very high frequency) FM.

Although a relatively large backpack-carried radio rather than a handheld model, the SCR-300 was described in War Department Technical Manual TM-11-242 as "primarily intended as a walkie-talkie for foot combat troops", and so the term "walkie-talkie" first came into use.

The final acceptance tests took place at Fort Knox, Kentucky in Spring 1942. The performance of the SCR-300 during those tests demonstrated its capacity to communicate through interference and the rugged quality of the design. Motorola was to produce nearly 50,000 of the SCR-300 units during the course of World War II.

The SCR-300 saw action in the Pacific Theater, beginning in New Georgia in August 1943. Colonel Ankenbrandt informed General Meade that "they are exactly what is needed for front line communications in this theater". In his point of view, the main difficulty was keeping them supplied with fresh batteries.

The SCR-300 saw heavy use in the Normandy invasion and the Italian campaign. It also became "key equipment" that helped deter confusion in the Battle of the Bulge.

The British adopted the design of the SCR-300 for their own use from 1947 as the "Wireless Set No. 31".

The SCR-300 was used by Guerrillas in the Korean war.

== Specifications ==
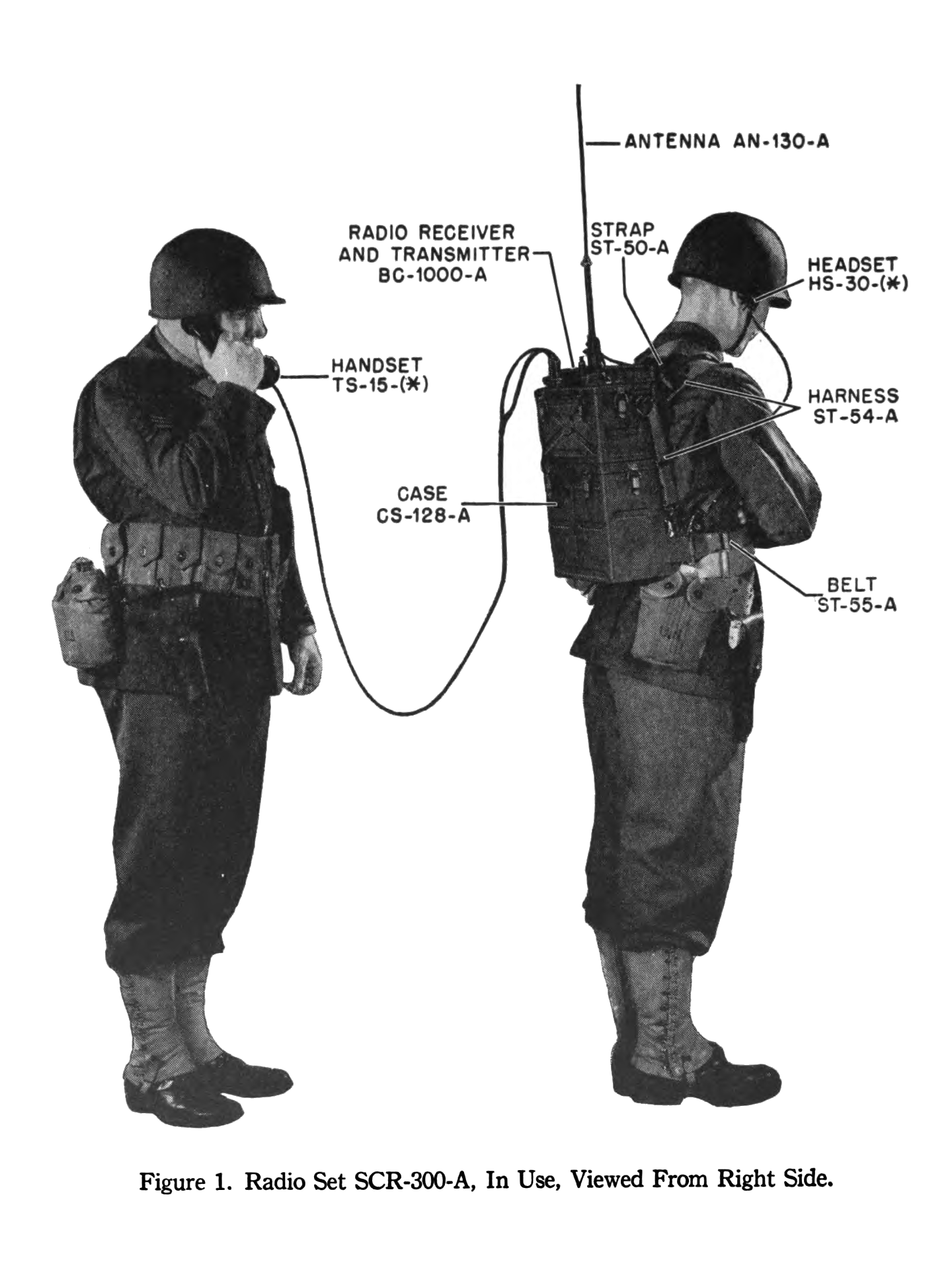
Signal Corps Radio set SCR-300-A

The SCR-300 was an 18-tube battery operated VHF battlefield radio half-duplex transceiver. It used an FM transmitter section and a double superheterodyne receiver. It incorporated an adjustable squelch circuit, an automatic frequency control circuit, a crystal controlled calibration circuit, easy to use tuning/channel selection, tuning lock to prevent accidental frequency changes, and radio relay or retransmission capability using two SCR-300 units and the appropriate cable assemblies.

- Weight:

With battery BA-70: 38.23 lb (17.34 kg)
With battery BA-80: 32.23 lb (14.62 kg)

- Power supply requirements:

Filaments: 4.5 volts
Receiver plate: 90 volts
Transmitter plate: 150 volts (using additional 60 volt battery)

- Antenna:

AN-130-A: Two section flexible whip, 33 inches (84 cm)
AN-131-A: Eight section flexible whip, 10 ft 8 in (325 cm)

- Frequency range: VHF between 40–48 MHz (7.5–6.2 m)
- Channel spacing: 200 kHz
- Channel Selection via "TUNING" control, channel display showing channel 0 (40.000 MHz) to channel 40 (48.000 MHz)
- Modulation: FM voice
- Vacuum tubes:

3A4 (2)
1T4 (6)
1L4 (5)
1R5 (1)
1A3 (1)
1S5 (3)

- RF Power output: 0.3 watts
- Frequency calibration (crystal oscillator) 4.3 MHz 10th harmonic (43.0 MHz) and 11th harmonic (47.3 MHz) marked on channel display - channel 15 (43.000 MHz) and halfway between channels 36 (47.200 MHz) and 37 (47.400 MHz)
- Range: approximately 3 miles (4.8 km) (varied considerably with terrain, location of transmitter and receiver, and antenna used)

== War Department Technical Manuals ==
- TM 11-242 for Radio Set SCR-300-A (1945)
- TM 11-983 for PP-114 Vibrator power supply (1945)
- TM 11-637 for AN/VRC-3 (1944)

== See also ==
- ARC-5
- AN/PRC-6
- BC-348
- BC-654
- R-390A
- SCR-299
- SCR-536
- Signal Corps Radio
- Wireless Set No. 19
- Wireless Set No. 18
- Vintage amateur radio
- AN/PRC-77 Portable Transceiver
- SCR-694
- List of military electronics of the United States
