= BC-342 =

World War II U.S. Army radio equipment

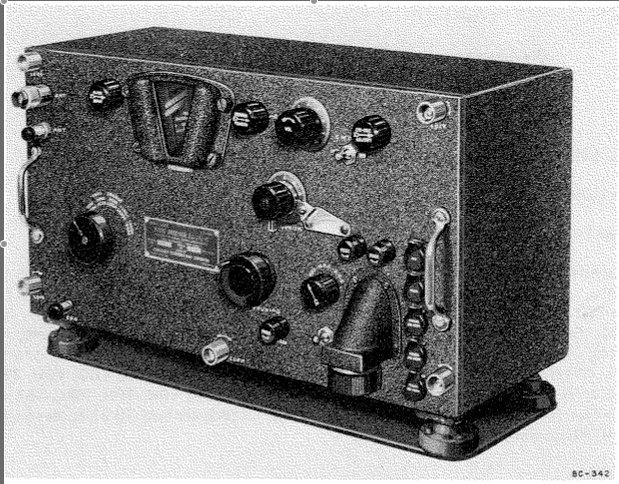
BC-342 radio receiver

The BC-342 was a World War II U.S. Army Signal Corps high frequency radio receiver. It was used primarily as part of field installations such as the SCR-188A, but could be used with mobile sets such as the 2 1/2-ton mounted SCR-399. First designed at Fort Monmouth, New Jersey by the U.S. Army Signal Corps, it was built by various manufacturers including RCA. Many of the later units that are encountered today were manufactured by the Farnsworth Television and Radio Corporation of Fort Wayne, Indiana. Variants include the low frequency coverage BC-344 receiver, and the battery or dynamotor powered BC-312 receiver.

== Specifications ==
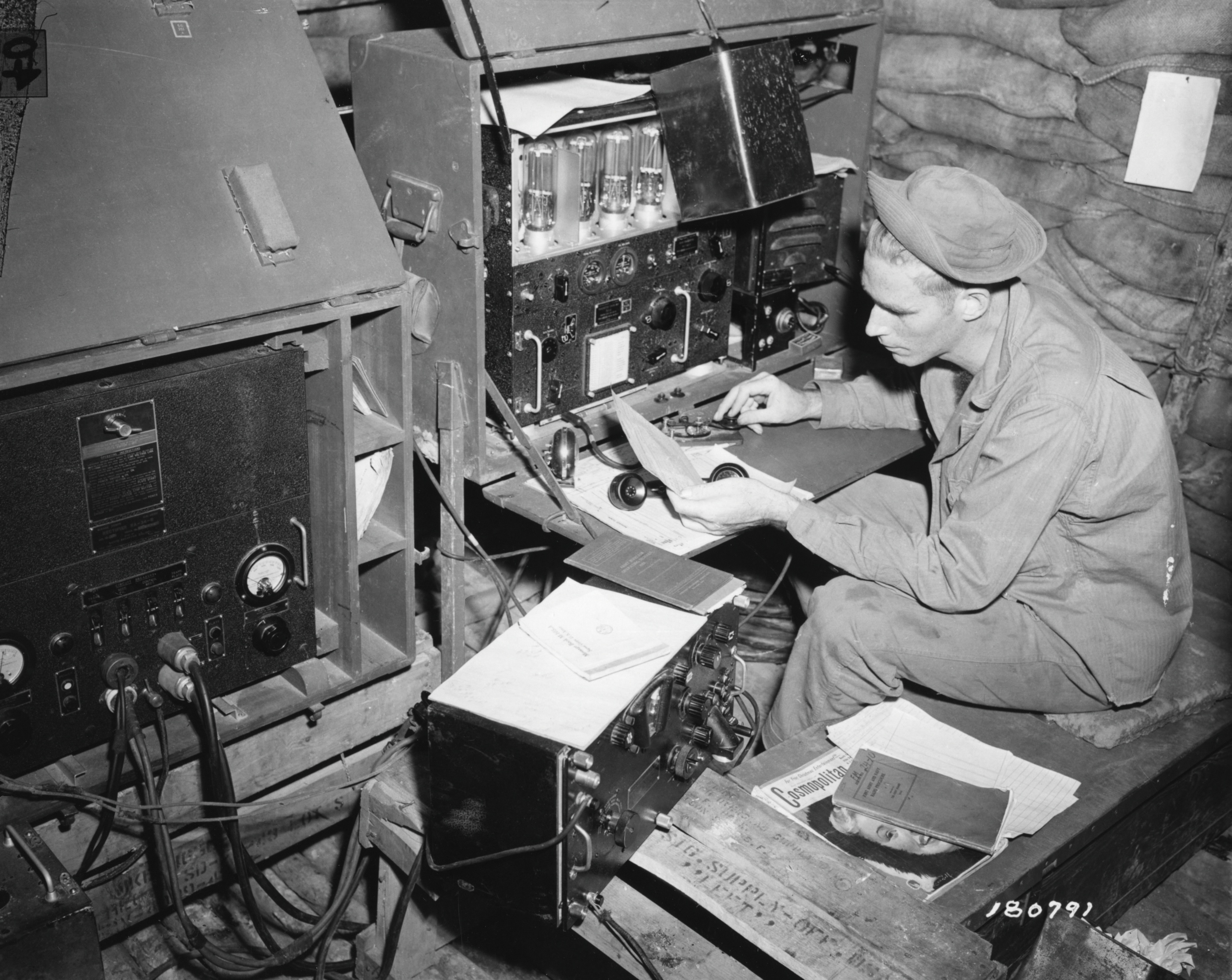
BC-342 radio receiver seen at bottom center, in use by Signal Corps operator in New Guinea

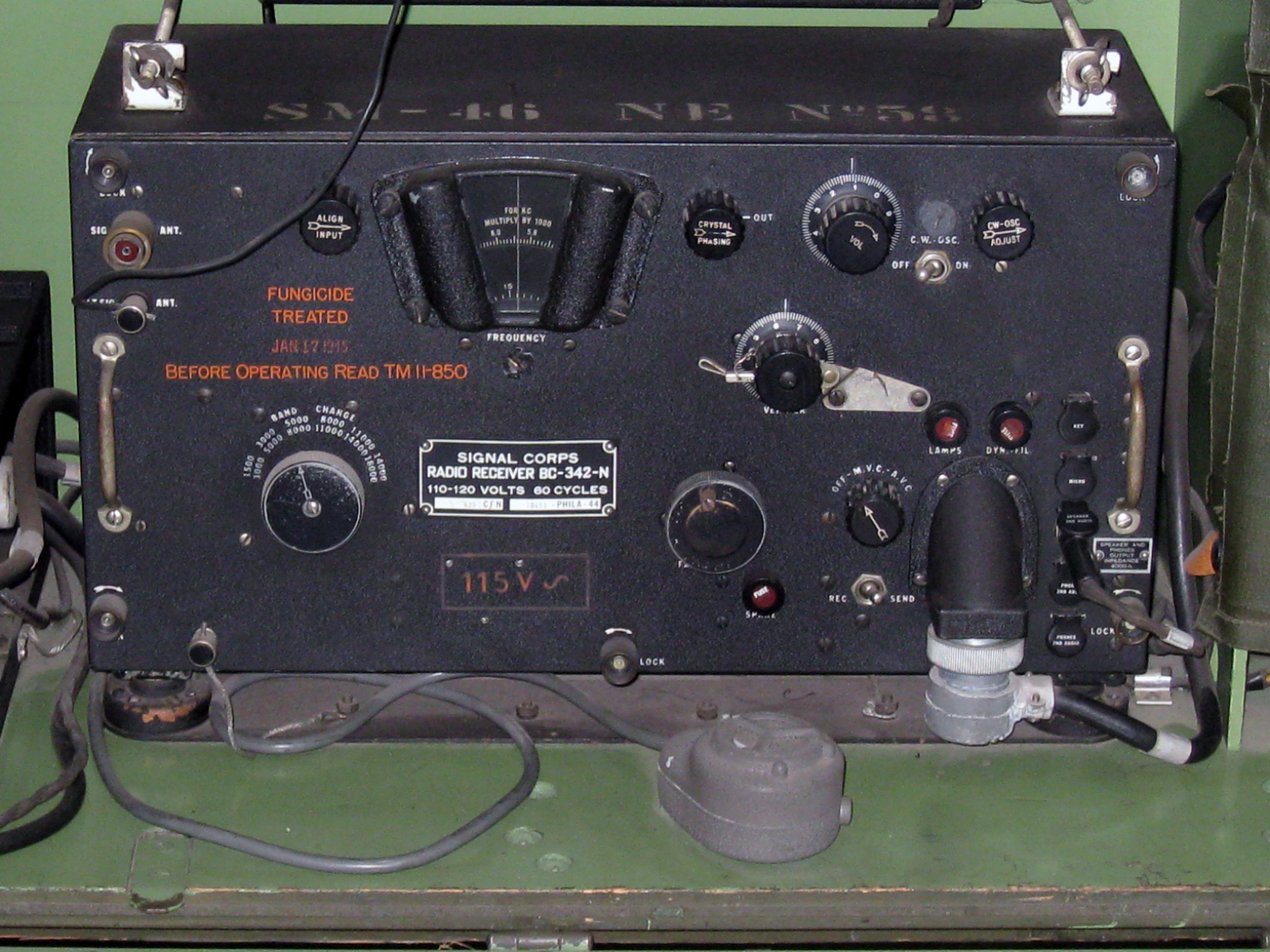
BC-342 in Schweizerisches Militärmuseum Full

The BC-342 could be operated from fixed and mobile positions.

- Power – An internal RA-20 AC rectifier power supply unit is fitted providing 250 volts DC and 12 volts AC for the receiver tube filaments (three pairs of the 6 volt tubes are wired in series and three in series / parallel).
- Manual Reference: TM 11-850
- Components: RA-20 Power Supply
- Weight: 58 lbs.
- Frequency Range: 1.5-18 MHz
- Power Input: 110 VAC 60 Hz
- Part of: SCR-197, SCR-237, SCR-277, SCR-299, SCR-399, MRC-1

10 vacuum tubes included:

- RF amplifiers – 6K7 (2)
- Mixer – 6L7
- Local oscillator – 6C5
- IF amplifiers – 6K7 (2)
- CW oscillator (BFO) – 6C5
- Detector/1st AF – 6R7
- Audio output – 6F6
- Rectifier – 5W4

The BC-342 was similar to the BC-348. Heavy chassis design was employed to minimize drift and oscillator instability due to temperature changes and vibration.

== BC-312 ==
The BC-312 was similar to the BC-342 but was designed to be directly powered by DC battery supply or dynamotor.

- Power input: 12/24 volts DC power requirements. 6 volt tubes (Valves) connected in series with filament strings.
- Frequency Range: 1.5 to 18 MHz
- 12A6 audio output tube in series with a resistor.
- Dynamotor B+ supply.

== BC-344 ==
The BC-344 was similar to the BC-342 but was designed to cover low frequency bands.

- Power input: 110 VAC 60 Hz
- Frequency range: 150 kHz to 1.5 MHz

== See also ==
- ARC-5
- Hammarlund super pro
- National HRO
- R-390A
- Signal Corps Radio
