= BC-610 =

The BC-610 was a radio transmitter based on the Hallicrafters HT-4 and was used by the U.S. Army Signal Corps during World War II.

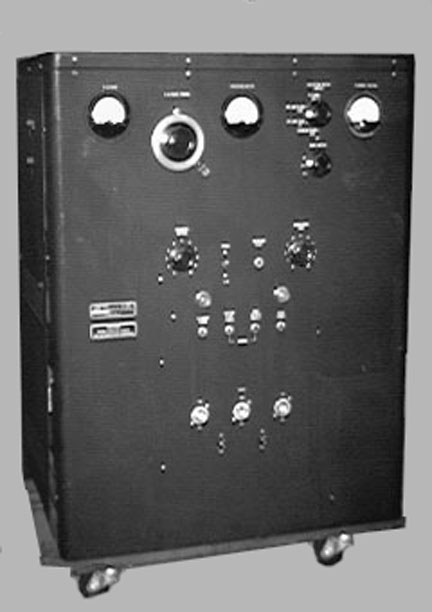
BC-610-I Transmitter

== History ==
In the early 1940s, the U.S. military sought a high-powered radio transmitter capable of infallible voice communications over 100 miles (160 km), sturdy enough to work in all conditions, flexible enough to be able to cover a wide range of frequencies, self-powered and able to operate in motion or at fixed locations. The Hallicrafters HT-4 transmitter was chosen from units available from various U.S. radio manufacturers. The HT-4 was designed for amateur radio use and had been commercially available for several years at a price of approximately $700, rivaling the cost of a car. It was considered compact and stable for its era and could deliver in excess of 300 watts of power for voice or MCW communications and 400 watts during Morse code operation. As was typical in physically large vacuum tube equipment, the manual cautions power output is less at higher frequencies. It was quartz crystal controlled, but could be used over a wide range of frequencies through use of the master-oscillator power amplifier.

Modifications requested by the Signal Corps were performed by Hallicrafters' engineers working with U.S. Army technicians at Fort Monmouth. They made a new version of the HT-4, which was known as the BC-610 transmitter, a part of the SCR-299 mobile communications unit, and production began in 1942. General Dwight Eisenhower credited the SCR-299 in the reorganization of U.S. forces, which led to their victory against the Nazis at Kasserine Pass. The SCR-299 was also used in the Invasion of Sicily and later, Italy.

A BC-610 transmitter was used by double agent Juan Pujol García during WWII as part of Operation Fortitude. Clear reception by the Germans of messages transmitted by García, code name GARBO, were so crucial to the Allied deception that use of the relatively high-powered transmitter was deemed necessary.

Over 25,000 units were produced by Hallicrafters and other allied companies. In 1944, a short subject film was produced by the Jam Handy Organization and sponsored by the Hallicrafters Company detailing how the HT-4 transmitter was adapted for military service and dramatizing its use by the U.S. military during World War II.

== Specifications ==
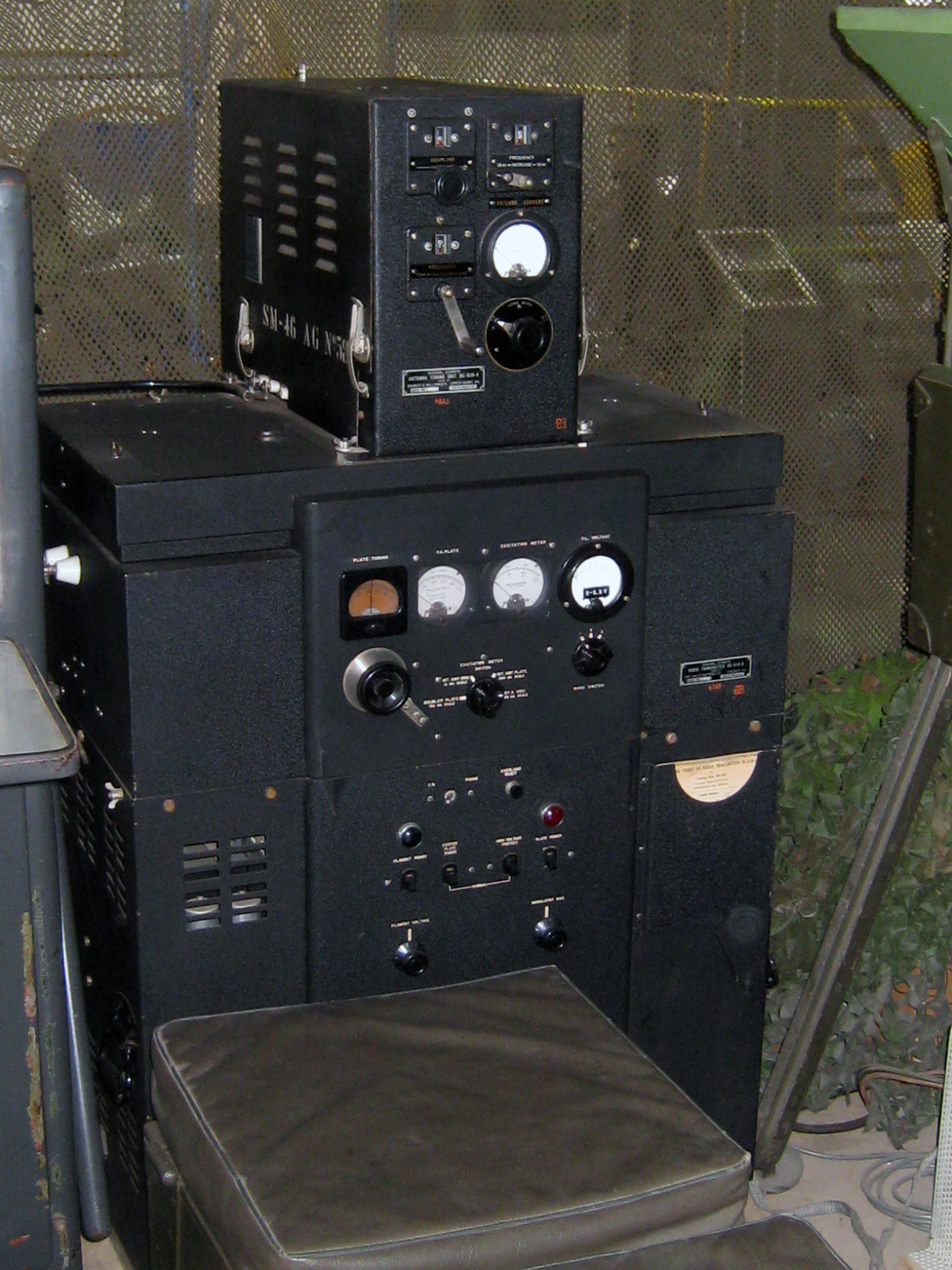
BC-610 Transmitter

- Frequency coverage: 2 to 18 MHz
- Mode: AM, CW
- RF power Output: <400 watts CW, <300 watts AM, MCW
- Vacuum tubes: Eimac 250TH final, pair 100TH modulator, various rectifier and low level tubes
- Operating frequency determined by plug-in tuning units and final coils (up to three at once) in addition to FT-171B crystals
- Signal Corps Radio sets: SCR-299, SCR-399, SCR-499, or GRC-38, AM requires BC-614 (or Hallicrafters HT-5) speech amplifier
- Weight: 390 lb (177 kg) (without BC-614)
- Manual: TM 11-280

The "A" through "I" models are the same basic unit with relatively minor component and cosmetic differences.

== See also ==
- ARC-5
- BC-348
- BC-654
- R-390A
- SCR-299
- Signal Corps Radio
- Vintage amateur radio
