= SCR-277 =

The SCR-277 was a mobile, trailer mounted radio range set for radio guidance of aircraft. It was standardized by the U.S. Army in June 1941.

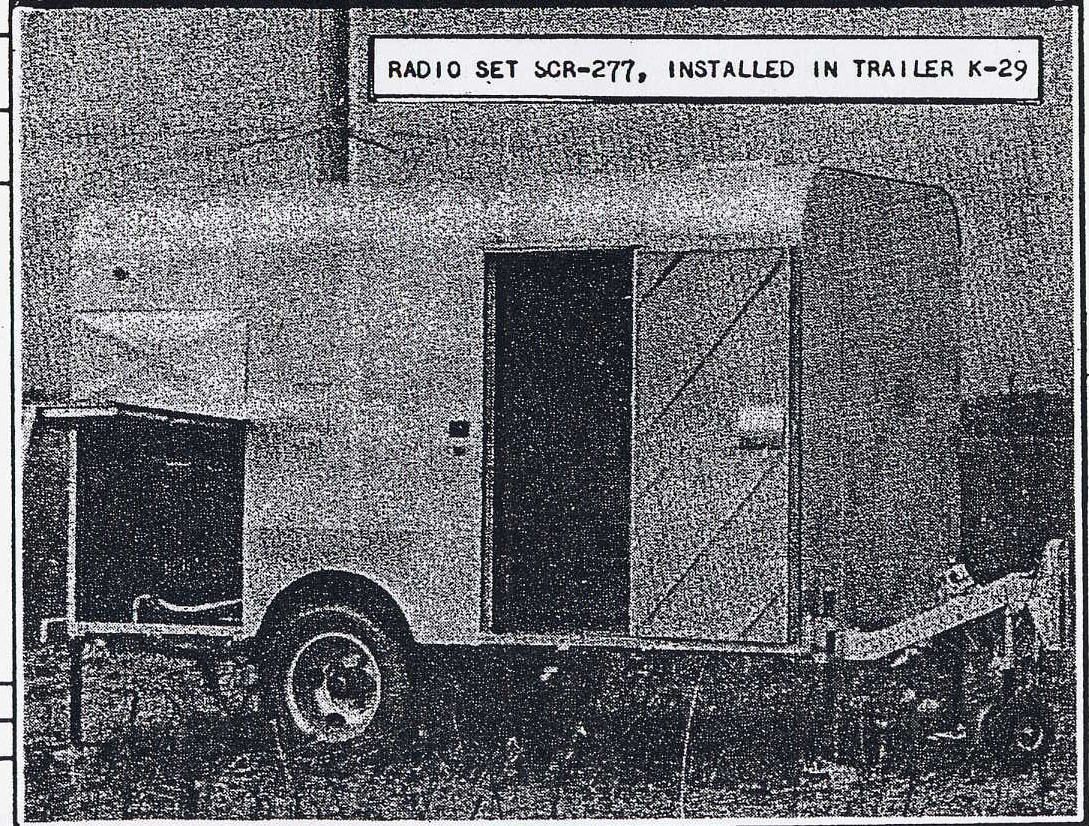
K-29 trailer for SCR-277, 1944

== Specifications ==
The SCR-277 was used as a navigation aid. It included the BC-467 transmitter with an RF output power of 800 watts, the BC-468 Goniometer, and BC-342 receiver. Frequencies utilized were 200-400 kHz for transmission and 1.5-18 MHz for reception. Radio range homing equipment transmitted tone identification signals to aircraft that lacked a radio compass but were equipped with command sets. Range was approximately 300 miles. It was powered by a single PE-90 generator.

== Use ==
In operation the transmitter sends out signals coded "A" or "N" in each of the four quadrants around the beacon. The signals overlap on the range, providing the pilot of the aircraft an indication of his position in relation to location of the beacon. Thus, if he is heading toward the beacon he will receive an aural signal coded "A" or "N" if he is between the beam, and when he is on the beam he will receive "AN" signal. Over land areas the beacon has a range of about 300 miles, while over water areas the range is extended to about 1,000 miles. Charts prepared for air navigation show the position and the orientation of the various beacons.

== See also ==
- Low Frequency radio range
- Signal Corps Radio
- List of U.S. Signal Corps vehicles
- List of U.S. military vehicles by supply catalog designation (G705)
- Radio navigation
- LORAN
- SHORAN
- Lorenz beam

== General references ==
- TM 9-2800 Standard Military Motor Vehicles. dated 1 September 1943
- TM 9-2800 Military vehicles dated October 1947
- TM 11-227 Signal Communication Directory. dated 10 April 1944
