= AN/ART-13 =

ART 13 radio transmitter

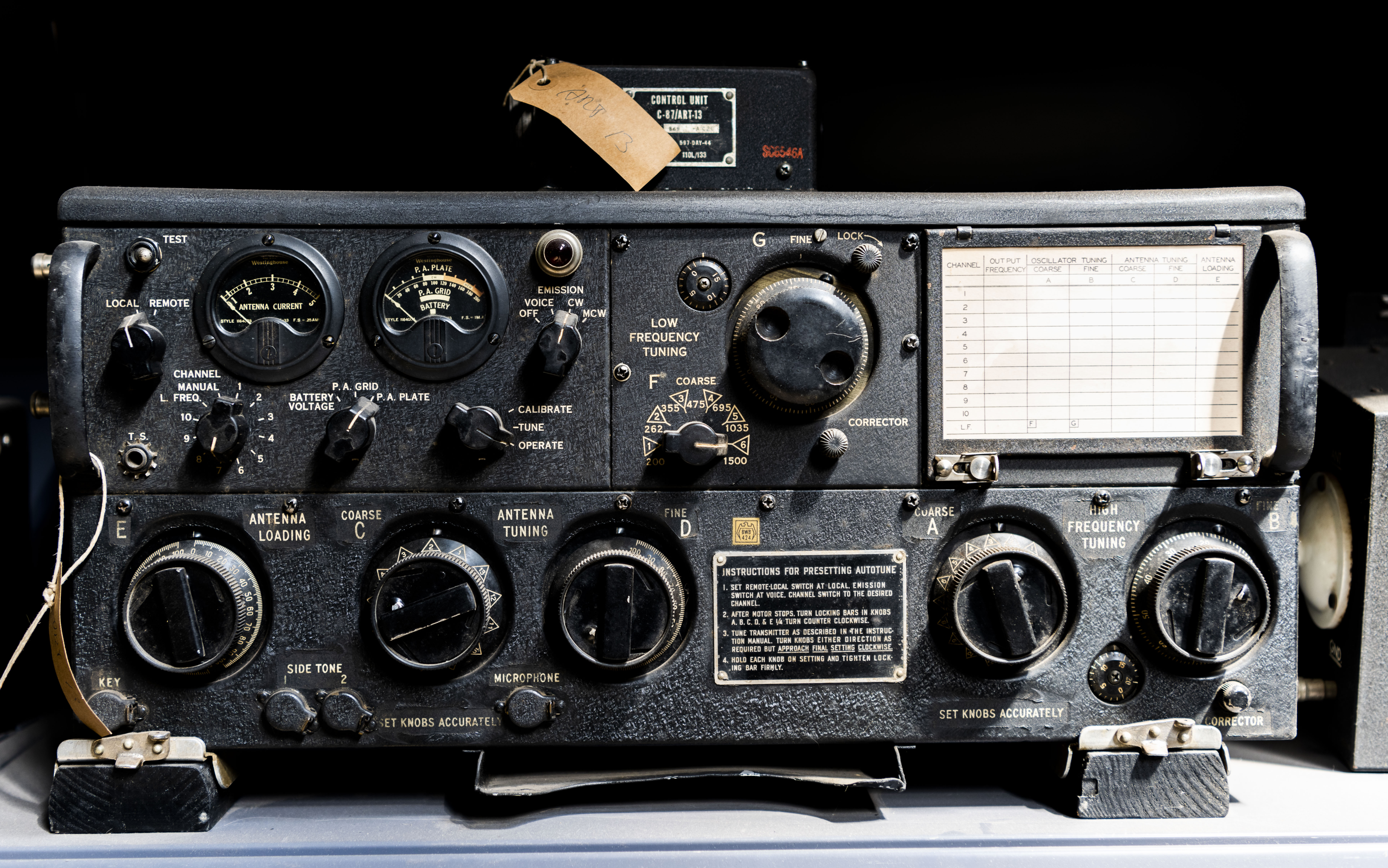
AN/ART-13 radio transmitter at the war museum, Overloon, NL

The AN/ART-13 was a radio transmitter manufactured by Collins Radio that found widespread use during and after World War II in military aircraft.

In accordance with the Joint Electronics Type Designation System (JETDS), the "AN/ART-13" designation represents the 13th design of an Army-Navy airborne electronic device for radio transmission equipment. The JETDS system also now is used to name all Department of Defense electronic systems.

== History ==
US Navy (T-47/ART-13 Radio Transmitter) training on board the USS Nereus, circa. 1952

In 1940 the Collins Radio Company designed a new radio transmitter for the US Navy. The transmitter, Navy designation ATC, was later re-designated under the Joint Army-Navy (JAN) system as T-47/ART-13. The Army Air Force adopted a slightly improved version as the T-47A/ART-13, most made by Stewart-Warner. The USAAF matched the AN/ART-13A with the BC-348 receiver, whose -R and -Q models were known under the JAN system as the AN/ARR-11. The resulting communications system was known as the AN/ARC-8 and was the liaison radio set on many larger USAAF aircraft beginning late in World War II. Some were still in service in the early 1970s.

The earlier AN/ART-13 was widely used in post-World War II Navy aircraft, being paired up post-World War II with the Navy's AN/ARR-15 auto-tune receiver. The resulting communications system was known as the AN/ARC-25. Its replacement began with the Collins AN/ARC-38 AM transceiver in the early 1950s, which in turn was upgraded to the AN/ARC-38A USB transceiver in the late 1950s. The Russians made nearly exact copies of the AN/ART-13 transmitter (called RSB-70 and R-807) for use on their military aircraft. It is thought that they obtained AN/ART-13 units from battle damaged B-29 bombers that landed in Russia during World War II. It was well known that the Russians copied the B-29 bomber calling their version the Tu-4.

Enola Gay, the B-29 Superfortress bomber that dropped "Little Boy", the first atomic bomb on Hiroshima, Japan was equipped with the AN/ARC-8 combination. The AN/ART-13 is used today by ham radio operators interested in restoring and operating historic military gear. It is often paired with a BC-348 military receiver of World War II vintage or the later AN/ARR-15 autotuned receiver of postwar vintage.

== Performance ==
The AN/ART-13 operated in CW (code), MCW and AM (voice) modes and covered LF, MF and HF frequencies up to 18.1 MHz. It had ten autotuned VFO tuned channels that could be preset. Post-war modifications by COMCO and other companies added crystal frequency control capability and were approved for use on civil airliners. Power output was approximately 100 watts using an 813 vacuum tube as the final amplifier. Under favorable atmospheric conditions communications could be established between aircraft and ground stations separated by thousands of miles.

== See also ==
- List of military electronics of the United States
- ARC-5
- BC-348
- BC-654
- Collins Radio
- R-390A
- Wireless Set No. 19
- Vintage amateur radio
- Signal Corps Radio
