= SCR-694 =

Portable World War II-era US military two-way radio

The SCR-694 is a portable high frequency two way Signal Corps Radio used by the U.S. military during World War II. The SCR-694 provided transmission and reception of AM, MCW or CW radiotelegraphy within the frequency range of 3.8 to 6.5 MHz (78.89 to 46.12 m). The radio set consists of the BC-1306 receiver and transmitter along with ancillary equipment, not all of which was required in every signal mission.

== History ==
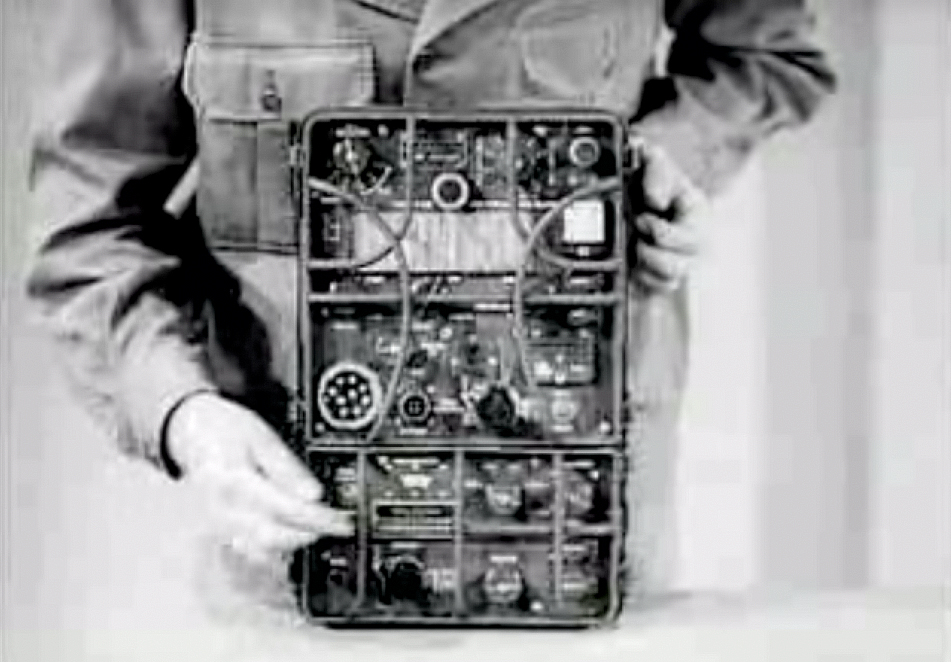
BC-1306 receiver and transmitter component of the SCR-694 radio set

The SCR-694 began to replace the SCR-284 from mid 1944, with improved range and reduced weight (around half of its predecessor), though the latter continued to be used up until the end of the war. Designed to provide communication between moving or stationary vehicles or as a portable field radio, the SCR-694 was originally intended for use by mountain troops and airborne forces but soon became the Army-wide standard at battalion level.

The SCR-694 saw use all over the army in many different theaters; notable instances include at regimental division headquarters during the Normandy invasion and the Cabanatuan prison raid as well as by scouts and reconnaissance units in the Pacific War.

It was later replaced by the AN/GRC-9, which saw first documented use in the Korean war.

== Specifications ==
- Weight
  - Complete radio set: 191.5 pounds (86.9 kg).
  - Set configured for dismounted operation: 108 lb (49 kg)
  - BC-1306 with panel cover: 27 lb (12 kg)
- Transmitter — MOPA (master oscillator, power amplifier). Either of two crystal controlled master oscillator frequencies or operator tuning of master oscillator frequency may be selected. Suppressor grid modulation of the power amplifier is provided in radiotelephone and modulated continuous wave operation. Radio frequency (RF) power output 2 watts to 25 watts dependent on power switch setting, selected emission type and direct current (dc) power available at the power receptacle.
- Receiver — Single conversion superheterodyne, intermediate frequency 456 kilohertz.
  - RF sensitivity in phone operation: 5 microvolts
  - RF sensitivity in CW operation: 3 microvolts
  - Selectivity: 3 to 6 kHz (99.93 to 49.97 km) Receiver frequency is independent of transmitter frequency.
- Range:
  - Up to 15 miles (24 km) for phone operation
  - Up to 30 miles (48 km) for CW between moving vehicle installations
- Power supply — The BC-1306 requires 400 to 500 volts direct current (VDC), 90 to 105 VDC, 6 VDC and 1.5 VDC. These voltages may be supplied by the GN-58 hand-cranked generator or the PE-237 Vibrator Power Unit, which may be operated from 6, 12 or 24 VDC. The receiver may be operated from dry battery BA-48.
- Partial list of additional components of the set — panel cover, mast sections for vertical antenna, wire antenna AN-160, spare parts, vehicle mount, mast bracket, mast base, telegraph key, crystal kit, headsets, microphones, electrical cords, bags, technical manual.
- Technical manual — TM 11-230C.

== Notes ==
- TM 11-227 Signal Communication Directory. dated 10 April 1944
- TM 11-487 Electrical Communication systems Equipment. dated 2 Oct. 1944

== See also ==
- Signal Corps Radio
- SCR-300 backpack mounted unit
- SCR-536 handheld transceiver
