= SCR-284 =

The SCR-284 was a World War II era combination transmitter and receiver used in vehicles or fixed ground stations.

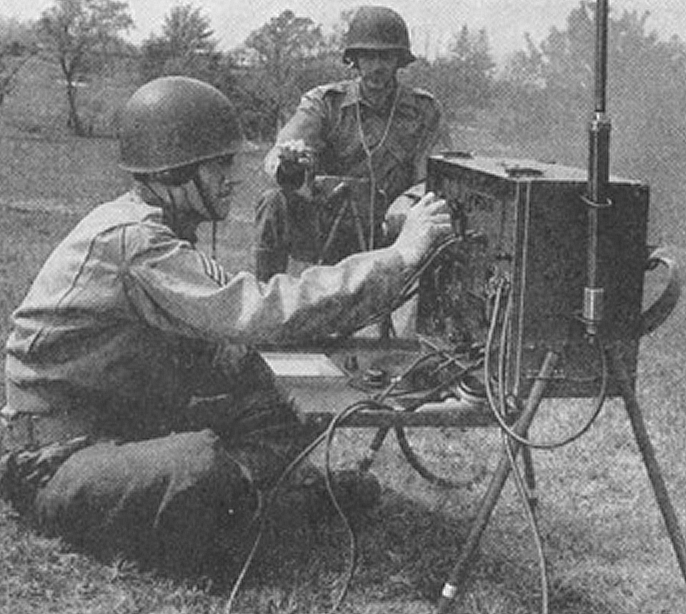
BC-654 in operation

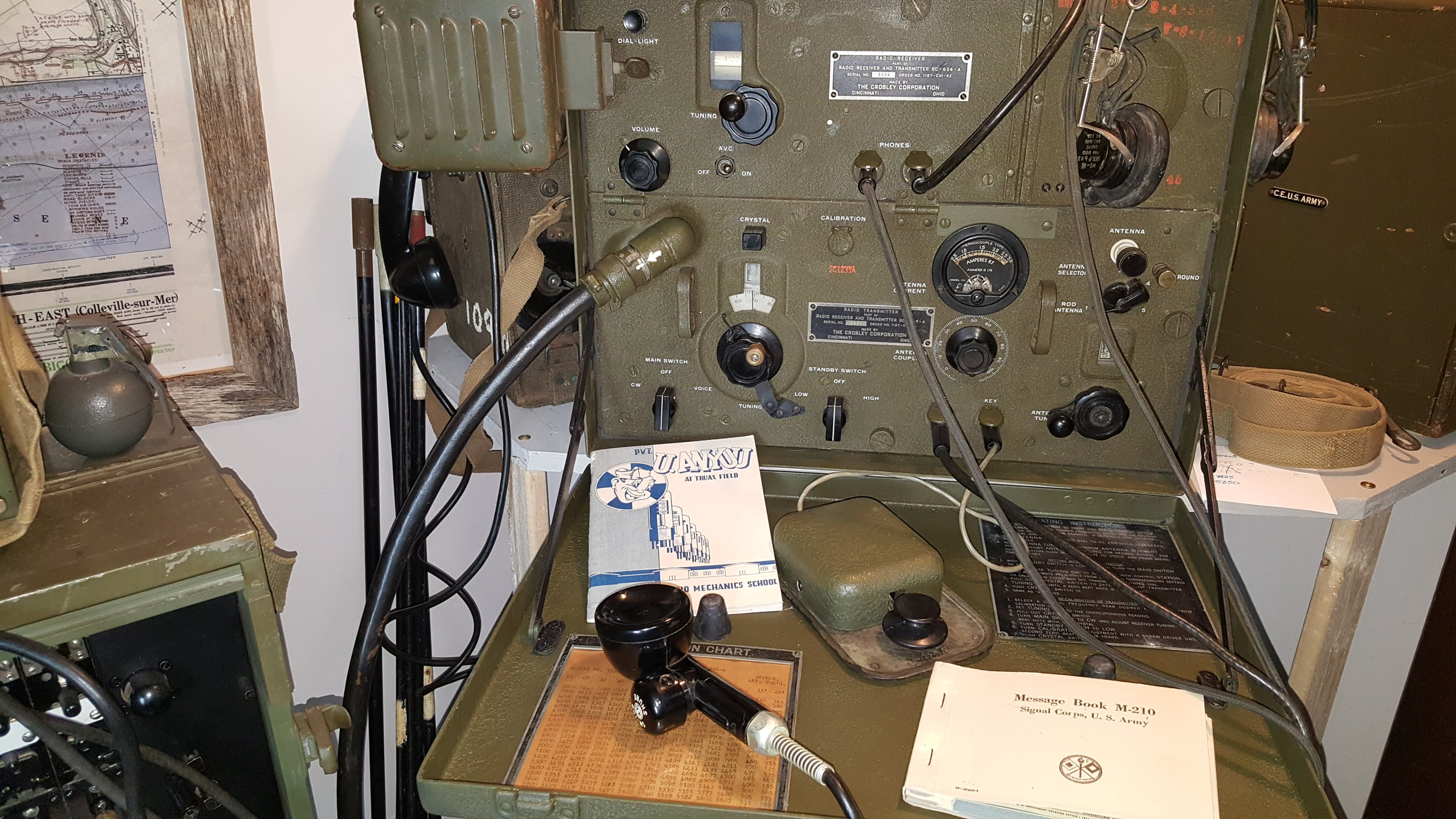
SCR-284 on Display

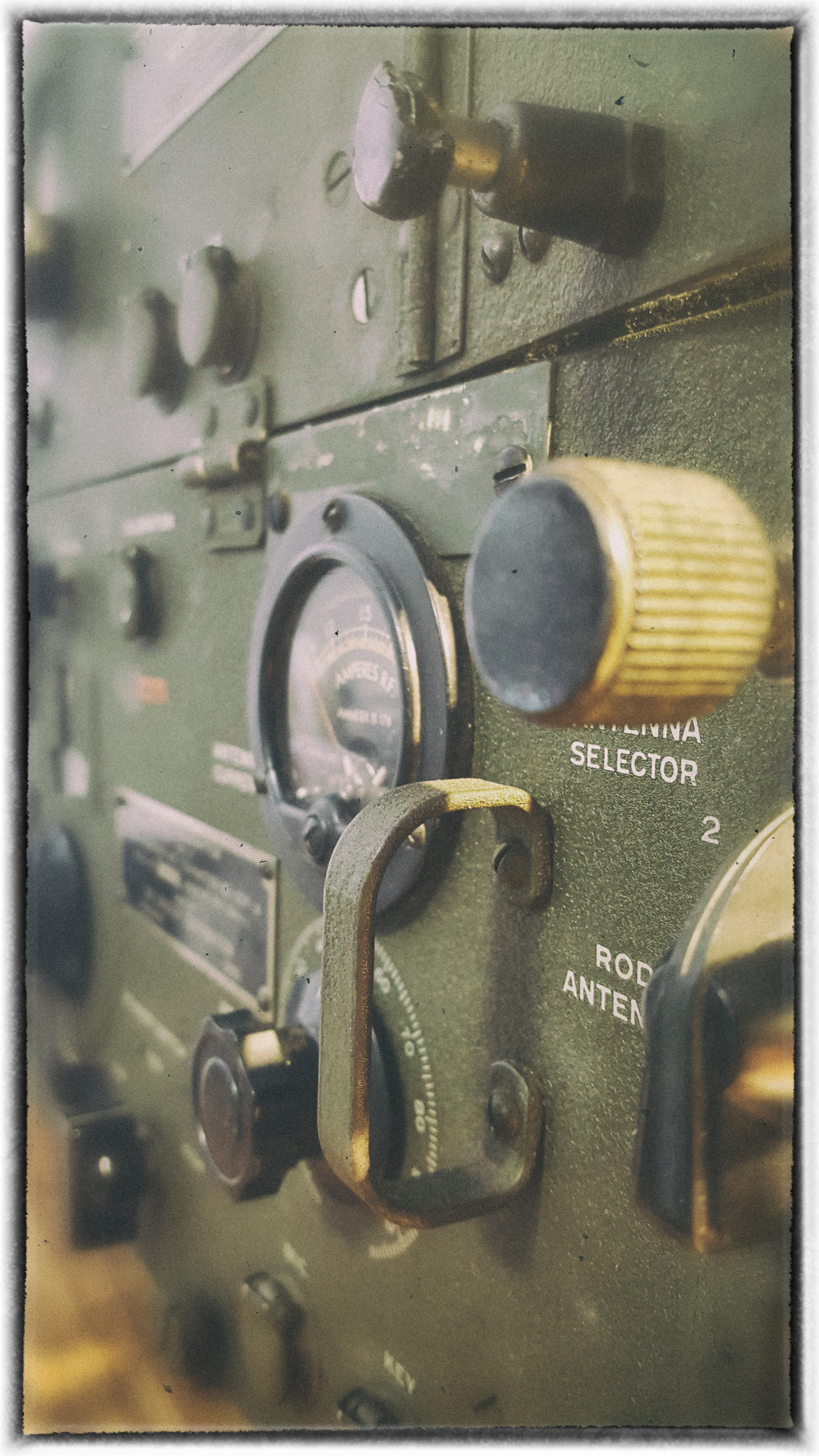
Front Panel Detail

== History ==
The Crosley Corporation of Cincinnati, Ohio manufactured the Signal Corps Set, Complete, Radio, 284 (SCR-284) that consists of the Basic Component 654 (BC-654) and associated support equipment.

The SCR-284 was introduced in Africa during Operation Torch and was the first radio set used for communications from the beach to the U.S. Fleet to coordinate naval gunfire and beach radio networks.

The set was used by Merrill's Marauders while operating in the China-Burma-India Theater and missions behind Japanese lines in Burma to communicate with air transport and other military aircraft, although some radiomen complained that it was "very inefficient" compared to other radio sets and "very hard to generate power".

The SCR-284 saw use in the Guadalcanal Campaign for portable operation with a hand crank generator. Transport over rough roads by Jeep tended to damage it, so it was disassembled and carried by several men.

The SCR-284 was also used in the New Georgia Campaign, but was so heavy and prone to humidity damage it was sometimes left behind.

More than 50,000 SCR-284s were produced and delivered in support of Operation Overlord, the D-Day invasion of Normandy. The complete SCR-284 transmitter, receiver, power unit and accessories weighed more than 100 pounds, but could be divided into sections for transport. The 45 pound BC-654 transmitter was notably difficult for radiomen to carry during combat, and has been described as "roughly the weight, size and shape of a modern window air conditioner".

63972 units were eventually produced in total. After the war, many BC-654s were sold as surplus for $15 each. Today, many are restored and operated by vintage amateur radio enthusiasts.

== Configurations ==
- Field Radio Set – World War II era. Battery powered receiver, hand crank generator powered transmitter.
- Vehicular Radio Set – World War II era. 6/12 V dynamotor power, vibrator supply.
- Command Radio Set – Korean War era. two-cycle 3600 RPM, 1 horsepower gas generator power.

== Technical description ==
- Technical Manual TM 11-275, final edition dated 14 January 1944 with Supplements dated 11 February 1944 and 5 April 1945.
- Frequency Range: continuous, 3800 to 5800 kHz
- Modes: AM voice, CW (Morse code), MCW
- Receiver Type: Single conversion superheterodyne receiver
- IF Frequency: 455 kHz
- Dimensions: 18" × 14" × 9 3/4" (BC-654 only)
- Weight: 44.75 lb (20.3 kg) (BC-654 only)

== Performance specifications ==
- Transmitter output
  - AM: 17 watts
  - CW: 24 watts
- Receiver Sensitivity: TBS

== In popular culture ==
- In the TV show The Munsters, Grandpa Munster was depicted using a BC-654 as part of his amateur radio station.

== See also ==
- ART 13 transmitter
- ARC-5
- BC-348
- BC-610
- Wireless Set No. 19
- Signal Corps Radio
- SCR-300
- A/N URM-25D Signal Generator
- SCR-694

== General references ==
- TM-11-275 – Technical Manual And Operating Instructions for the SCR-284-A Radio Set (BC-654-A Radio Receiver And Transmitter)
