= R-390A =

HF radio communications receiver

The R-390A /URR is a general coverage HF radio communications receiver designed by Collins Radio Company for the United States Armed Forces.

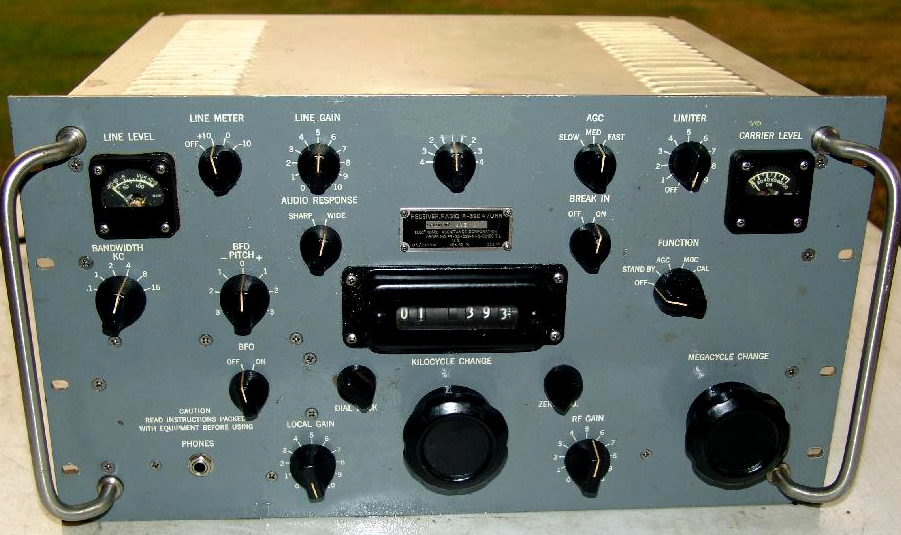
R-390A radio receiver

== History ==
The R-390A military shortwave radio receiver was the result of a project undertaken by the United States Army Signal Corps in 1954 to replace the existing R-390 receiver then in use. The R-390 had done its job so well that the Corps decided continued use of this type of receiver necessitated an improved, reduced-cost version. There are many references to the R390A in the open literature during this period; a picture of the receiver appeared in the May 1959 issue of QST.

The total production of the R-390A (as determined by the high serial numbers noted) is over 55,000 units. Initial production started in 1955 and ran through approximately 1970, and then was restarted in 1984 by Fowler Industries for Avondale Shipyards. Manufacturers and their approximate production numbers are:

Units produced
| Manufacturer | Approximate production numbers | Notes |
|---|---|---|
| Collins Radio Company | 6,363 | |
| Electronic Assistance Corp | 15,338 | Includes Dittmore Freimuth marked radios |
| Capehart | 4,242 | |
| Motorola | 14,873 | |
| Stewart-Warner | 6,631 | |
| Amelco/Teledyne/Imperial | 7,958 | These companies were related through acquisitions |
| Fowler Industries | 5 | |

Companies which made spare modules, but not whole sets were Communications Systems Corp., Clavier Corp. and Hacking Labs.

== Design ==
The R-390A is a general coverage radio receiver capable of receiving AM, CW, and FSK signals. Its tuning range is from 500 kHz to 32 MHz, in thirty-two 1 MHz bands. The circuit is the superheterodyne type, double conversion above 8 MHz, below which triple conversion is used. It employs 23 vacuum tubes, a larger than normal count for most general-coverage receivers.

Units produced
| Quantity | Part number | Type |
|---|---|---|
| 3 | 6AK6 | Pentode |
| 2 | 5654 | Pentode |
| 4 | 12AU7/5814A | Triode |
| 2 | 26Z5W | Full-Wave Vacuum Rectifier |
| 1 | 3TF7 | Current Regulator |
| 6 | 6BA6/5749W | Pentode |
| 3 | 6C4/6100 | Triode (Medium-μ) |
| 1 | 6DC6 | Pentode |
| 1 | 0A2WA | Voltage Regulator |

The receiver weighs 85 pounds (39 kg) and can be operated on 120-volt or 240-volt supplies. It fits neatly into a 10.5-inch-tall (270 mm) standard 19-inch rack. Tuning of the R-390A's radio frequency and intermediate frequency front end is synchronized by means of an ingenious mechanical system of racks, gears, and cams. When the front panel tuning controls are rotated, this system raises and lowers ferrite slugs in and out of the receiver's tuning coils. This ensures that all front-end circuits are tracked, meaning all circuits are tuned to the correct frequency to maintain excellent selectivity and sensitivity. The receiver's construction is modular for easy servicing. Each major area of the receiver is contained in easily removable subassemblies, and these can be repaired or replaced as needs be. Though the R-390A is mechanically and electrically complex, alignment and servicing were designed to follow simplified procedures published by the Signal Corps.

== Use ==
The R-390A was deployed to most branches of the US military and remained in general use through the 1980s. The last major update to its documentation was in 1984. As the military procured newer receivers, many R-390As were released to surplus while others were destroyed. Some receivers were retained by the services, however, when they found that the R-390A's vacuum tube circuitry could easily survive an electromagnetic pulse. There are reports, possibly apocryphal, that R-390A receivers are still in use aboard U.S. Navy submarines since the receiver can withstand the strong radio frequency fields found aboard ship.

Many of the R-390As that exist today are in the hands of vintage amateur radio collectors and amateur radio operators who contend that few modern solid state communications receivers can equal its performance. There is a wealth of information, both printed and electronic, devoted to R-390A restoration and maintenance, as the R-390A is widely considered an example of the best of vacuum tube technology.

== See also ==
- ART 13 transmitter
- ARC-5
- BC-348
- BC-654
- Collins Radio
- Hammarlund super pro
- National HRO
- Vintage amateur radio
- 75A-4 and KWS-1
