= BC-348 =

American military communications receiver

The BC-348 is an American-made communications receiver, which was mass-produced during World War II for the U.S. Army Air Force. Under the joint Army-Navy nomenclature system, the receiver system became known as the AN/ARR-11.

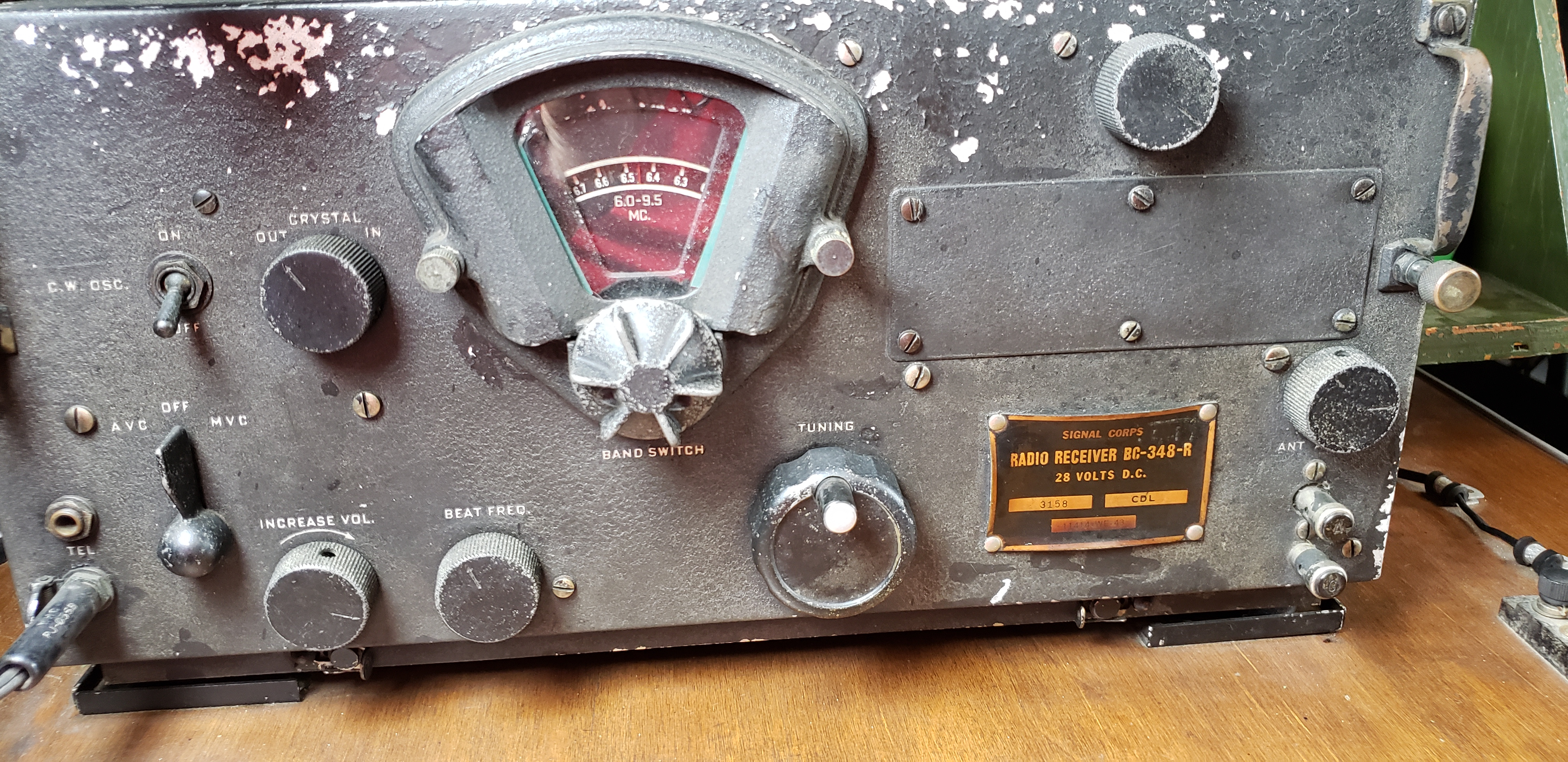
BC-348 Liaison radio receiver

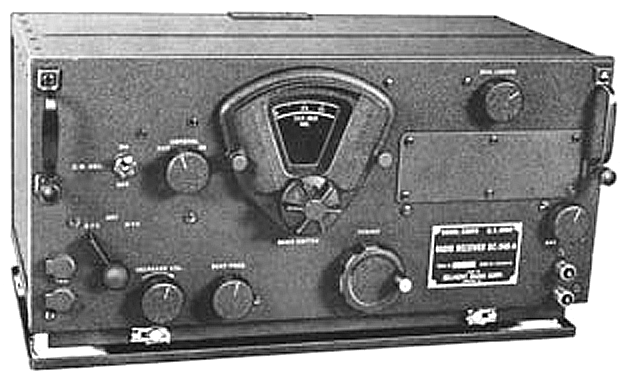
BC 348 radio receiver

== History ==
The BC-348 is the 28 vdc powered version of the 14 vdc powered BC-224. The first version, the BC-224-A, was produced in 1936. Installed in almost all USAAF multi-engined transports and bombers used during the fifteen-year period from before World War II through the Korean War, BC-348 radio receivers were easy to operate and reliable. They were also installed in some similar USN, British, and Canadian aircraft. Designed as LF/MF/HF receivers for use in larger aircraft (B-17, B-24, B-25, B-26, B-29, C-47, etc.), they were initially paired with a BC-375 transmitter in the SCR-287-A system. Late in World War II, the AN/ARR-11 (BC-348) was the receiver and the AN/ART-13A was the transmitter in the AN/ARC-8 system. They were also used in some ground and mobile installations such as the AN/MRC-20. The BC-348 series ran through several variations during its long production history, which included the BC-224. More than 100,000 of these receivers were produced, 80 percent by Belmont Radio and Wells-Gardner and the balance by RCA and Stromberg-Carlson.

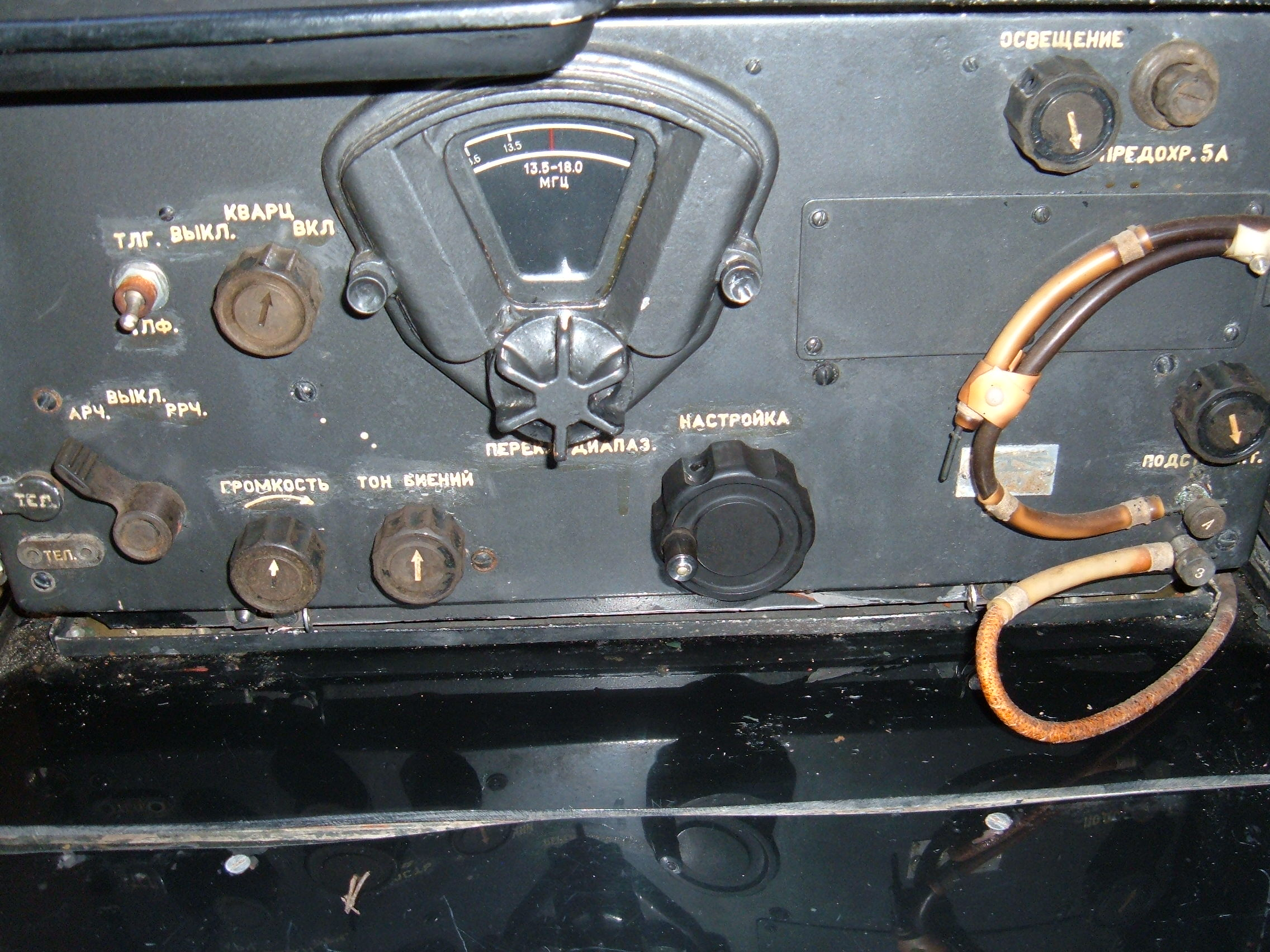
Russian version in an Il-14 aircraft

BC-348 receivers were copied and manufactured by the U.S.S.R. following War II, by the Russian Vefon Works and labeled УС-9 (US-9 in English) The УС-9 continued to be produced in the Soviet Union through the 1970s, with such improvements as a solid state inverter to replace the dynamotor.

Enola Gay, the B-29 Superfortress bomber that dropped "Little Boy", the first atomic bomb on Hiroshima, Japan, was equipped with a BC-348 receiver as part of the aircraft's AN/ARC-8 system. Today, many examples of the BC-348 are restored and operated by vintage and military amateur radio enthusiasts.

The AN/ARC-8 system was still in service in older USAF aircraft in the early 1970s. At that time, military surplus dealers near Davis-Monthan Air Force Base in Tucson, Arizona, had stacks of the BC-348, that had been removed from aircraft, for sale to the public.

== Specifications ==
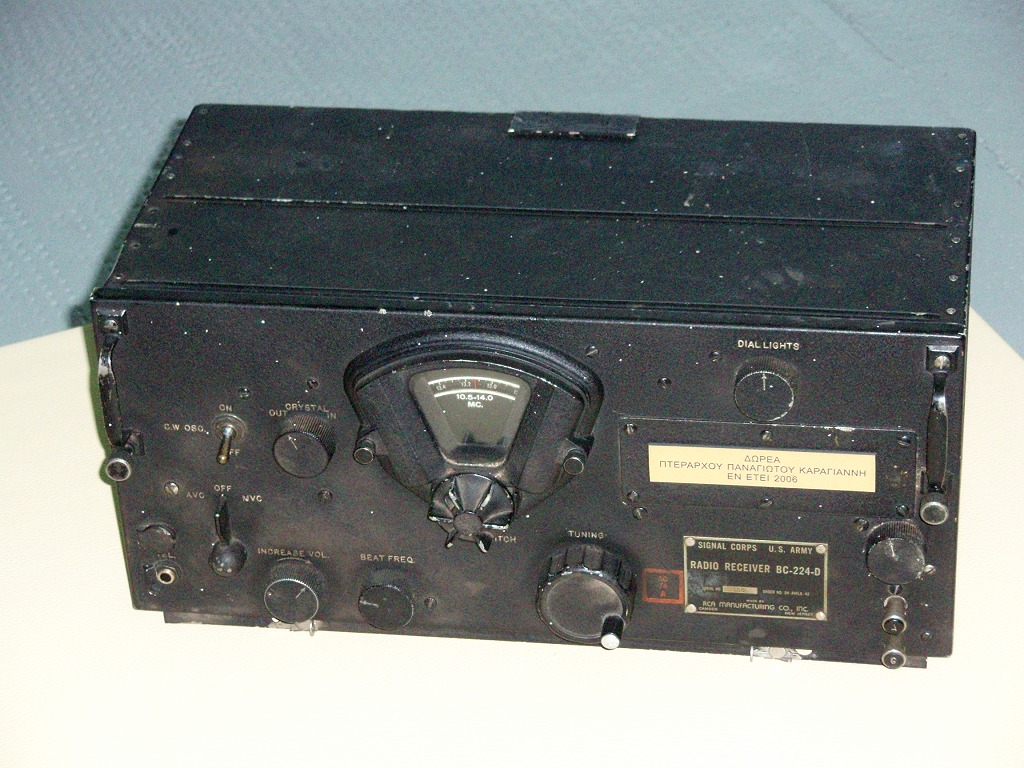
BC 224 version

The BC-224-A, -B, -C, and -D, and the BC-348-B, and -C, tuned 1.5-18 MHz in six bands. The Signal Corps had the receiver design modified to add a 200-500 kHz band and compress the 1.5-18 MHz coverage into the remaining five bands. This modified design became the BC-224-E and the BC-348-E. The 200–500 kHz and 1.5-18 MHz tuning range remained constant for subsequent production of all models.

== General references ==
- U. S. Army Signal Corps Technical Order No. 08-10-24, 12 June 1936, Instruction Book for Radio Receiver BC-224-A manufactured by RCA Manufacturing Co., Inc., Camden, N.J., U.S.A., Order No. SC-132373
- Army Air Forces Technical Order No. 08-10-119, 15 December 1942; Instruction Book for Operation and Maintenance of Radio Receiver BC-348-E Radio Receiver BC-348-M Radio Receiver BC-348-P
- U.S. Air Force Technical Order 12R2-3BC348-2, revised 15 April 1957; was AN 16-40BC-348-3, 21 June 1948; was AN 08-10-112, 17 July 1943, revised 18 December 1943, revised 30 July 1945; Handbook Maintenance Instructions Radio Receivers BC-348-J BC-348-N BC-348-Q
- U.S. Air Force Technical Order 12R2-3BC-112, revised 15 April 1957; was AN 16-40BC224-2, 20 July 1945, revised 11 May 1948; Handbook Maintenance Instructions Radio Receivers BC-224-F BC-224-K BC-348-H BC-348-K BC-348-L BC-348-R

== See also ==
- ARC-5
- ART 13 transmitter
- BC-610
- BC-654
- Collins Radio
- Hammarlund super pro
- National HRO
- R-390A
- List of military electronics of the United States
