= List of radios =

List of specific models of radios

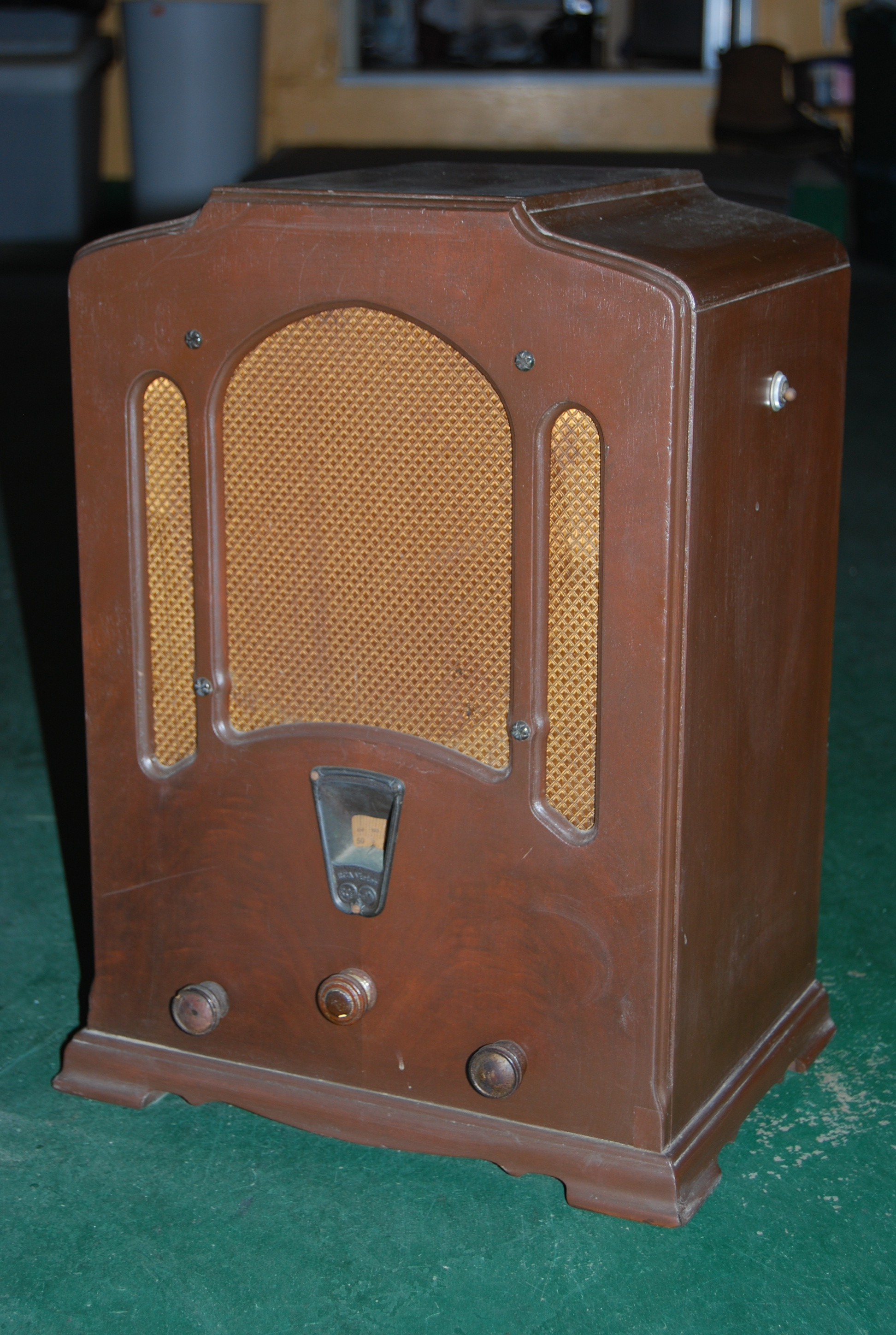
The RCA model R7 Superette superheterodyne table radio

This is a list of notable radios, which encompasses specific models and brands of radio transmitters, receivers and transceivers, both actively manufactured and defunct, including receivers, two-way radios, citizens band radios, shortwave radios, ham radios, scanners, weather radios and airband and marine VHF radios. This is a not to be confused with list of radio stations and outline of radio.

== Consumer radios ==
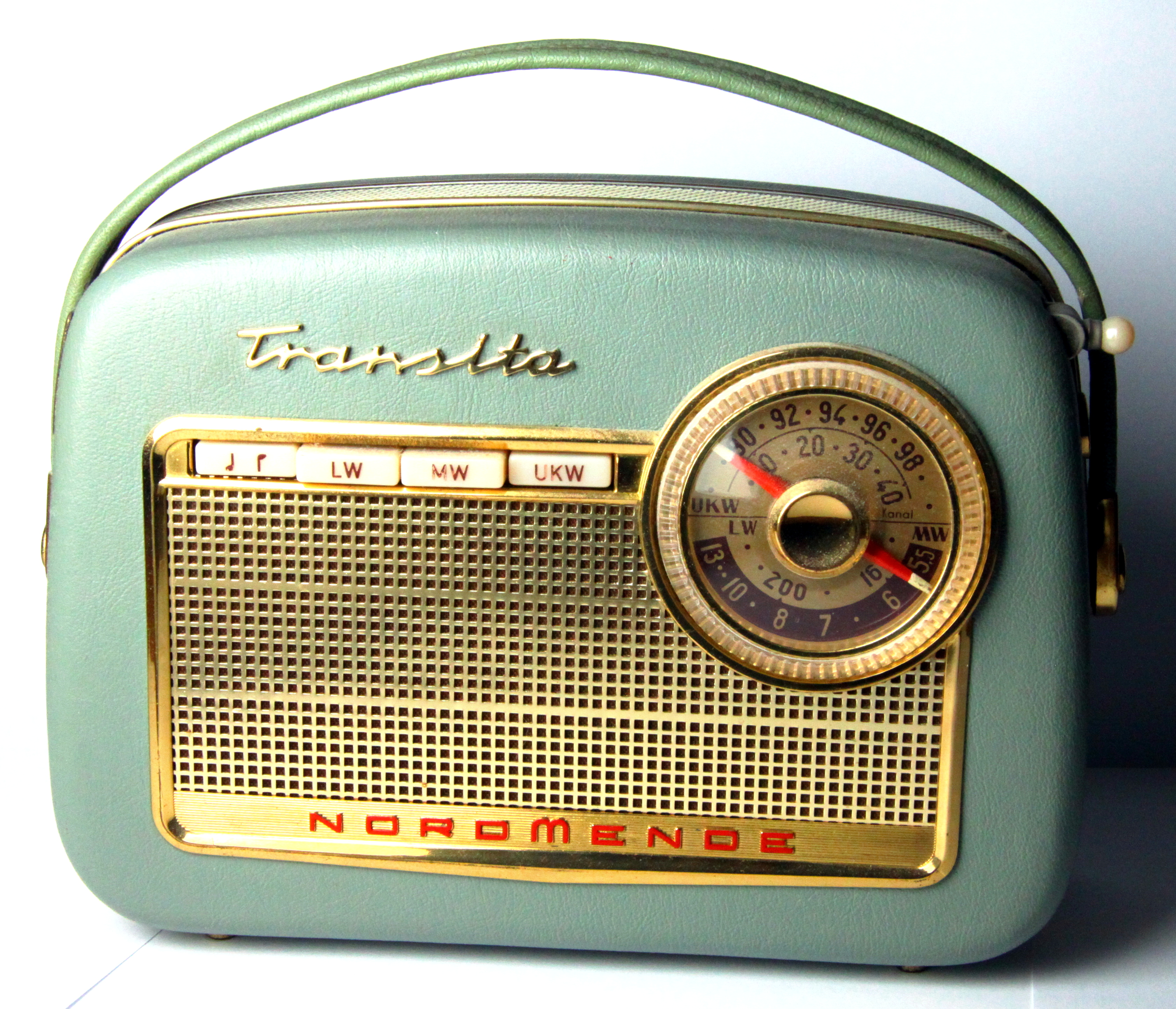
A Nordmende Transita radio

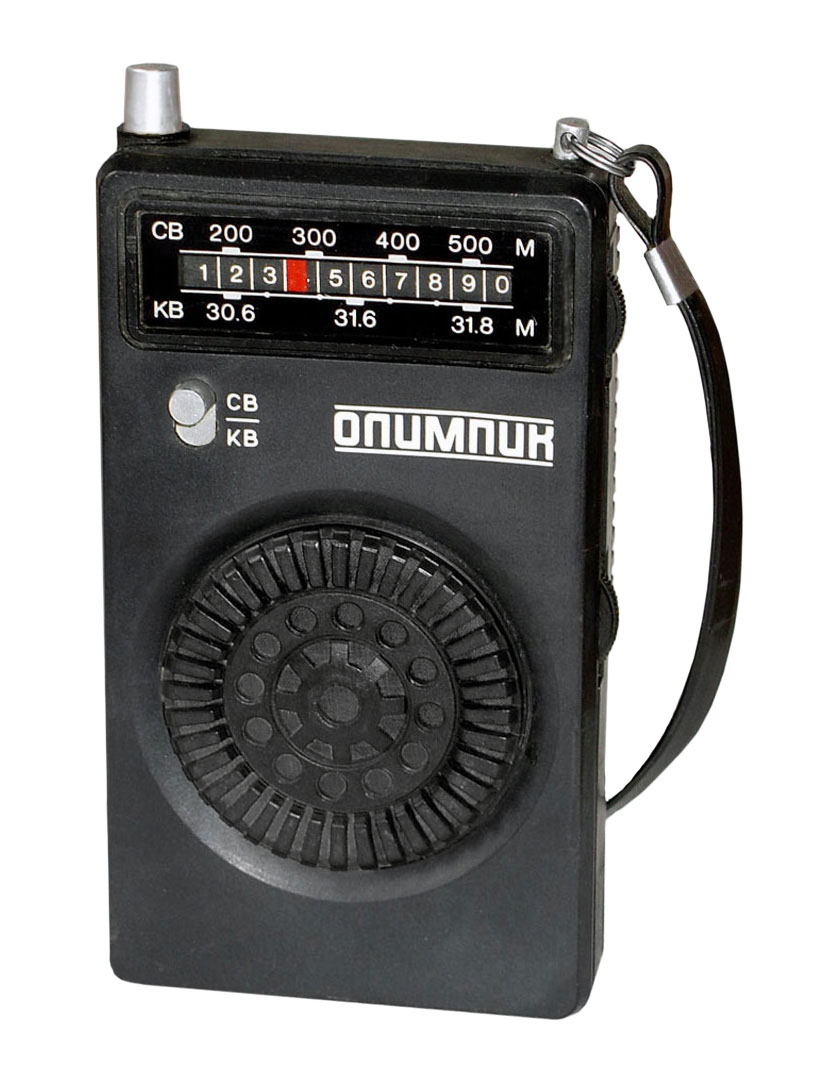
The first model of the Olimpik portable radio, designed by artist Mykola Lebid in 1977

- Bone Fone – was a wearable radio that draped around the user's neck like a scarf
- Collins 207B-1 Transmitter – was a radio transmitter manufactured in 1951 by Collins Radio Company
- Crosley Pup – was an affordable mass-produced AM radio introduced by Powel Crosley Jr. in the United States in 1925
- Icom – a manufacturer and brand of radio transmitting and receiving equipment, its product range now includes equipment for radio amateurs, pilots, maritime applications, land mobile professional applications and radio scanner enthusiasts.
- Majestic Radios – was an American radio brand from 1927 to 1955, trademarked as "The Mighty Monarchs of the Air"
- Motorola Saber – a commercial portable radio that is a product series of Motorola USA, Inc., it was developed for the United States Armed Forces sometime around 1989. Despite the fact of it being originally marketed to the military, many law enforcement agencies and fire departments realized the benefits of the Saber, and Motorola soon had a much larger customer base for the radio than they expected.
- National Panasonic Model RE-784A – a vacuum tube AM/FM table radio from the post-war era (1960s) manufactured by National Panasonic (defunct, now Panasonic). The miniature tube-based circuitry follows the "All American Five" tube design, which allowed a more compact footprint of the radio.
- Nordmende – formerly named Norddeutsche Mende-Rundfunk GmbH, the name was subsequently changed to Nordmende. Subsequently the company became one of the prominent German manufacturers of radios, televisions, tape recorders and record players in the 1950s and 1960s.
- Olimpik – a series of Soviet produced superheterodyne portable radio receivers
- Panapet – a round novelty radio on a chain, first produced by Panasonic in the early 1970s to commemorate the World Expo in Osaka, Japan
- Panasonic Toot-a-Loop Radio – was a novelty radio made by Panasonic Japan in the early 1970s that was designed to be wrapped around the wrist.
- RCA – acted as the sales agent for a small line of Westinghouse and GE branded receivers and parts used by home constructors, originally for a limited market of amateur radio enthusiasts. By 1922, the rise of broadcasting had dramatically increased the demand for radio equipment by the general public, and this development was reflected in the title of RCA's June 1, 1922 catalog, "Radio Enters the Home". RCA began selling receivers under the "Radiola" name, marketing equipment produced by GE and Westinghouse under the production agreement that allocated a 60%–40% ratio in output between the two companies.
- Realistic – a brand produced by RadioShack, a division of Tandy Corporation, to market audio and video products for home use. The brand name was phased out in the mid 1990s and discontinued in 2000, then returned briefly in 2016. A very wide range of products was marketed under the Realistic brand. These included record players, stereo receivers, cassette decks, ham radios, musical synthesizers and a few quadraphonic receivers and shortwave radios.
- Regency TR-1 – the first commercially manufactured transistor radio, it was introduced in 1954. Despite mediocre performance, about 150,000 units were sold, due to the novelty of its small size and portability.
- SRF-39 – a portable AM/FM radio introduced in approximately 1992 by Sony. It uses a single AA battery, as its analog electronics draw very little current. It was one of the first radios to use the CXA1129 30-pin integrated circuit, which later was responsible for the SRF-39's sensitive and selective performance.
- Superette – introduced in 1931 by RCA, these radio receivers used the superheterodyne principle but were lower cost than earlier products, in an attempt to maintain sales during the onset of the Great Depression.
- Tivoli Audio PAL – a radio produced by Tivoli Audio. It was designed by Henry Kloss (1929–2002). Supporting both the FM and AM bands, it was designed as an outdoor, portable version of the earlier Tivoli Audio Model One.
- TR-55 – released in 1955, this was Sony's first transistor radio, and the first to be made in Japan. The use of transistors allowed the device to be much smaller than earlier vacuum tube radios.
- Utility Radio – also known as the Wartime Civilian Receiver, it was a valve domestic superheterodyne receiver manufactured in Great Britain during World War II starting in July 1944. It was designed by G.D. Reynolds of Murphy Radio. Both AC and battery-operated versions were made.
- Walkman – The original Walkman, released in 1979, was a portable cassette player. The Walkman brand was later extended to serve most of Sony's portable audio devices as well as related media devices, including radio receivers.
- Walkman Bean – shaped like a bean, it was available in three versions: the basic model with 512MB capacity (model NW-E205), the basic model with an inbuilt FM radio (model NW-E305), and a higher-capacity 1GB model (model NW-E307).
Consumer radios

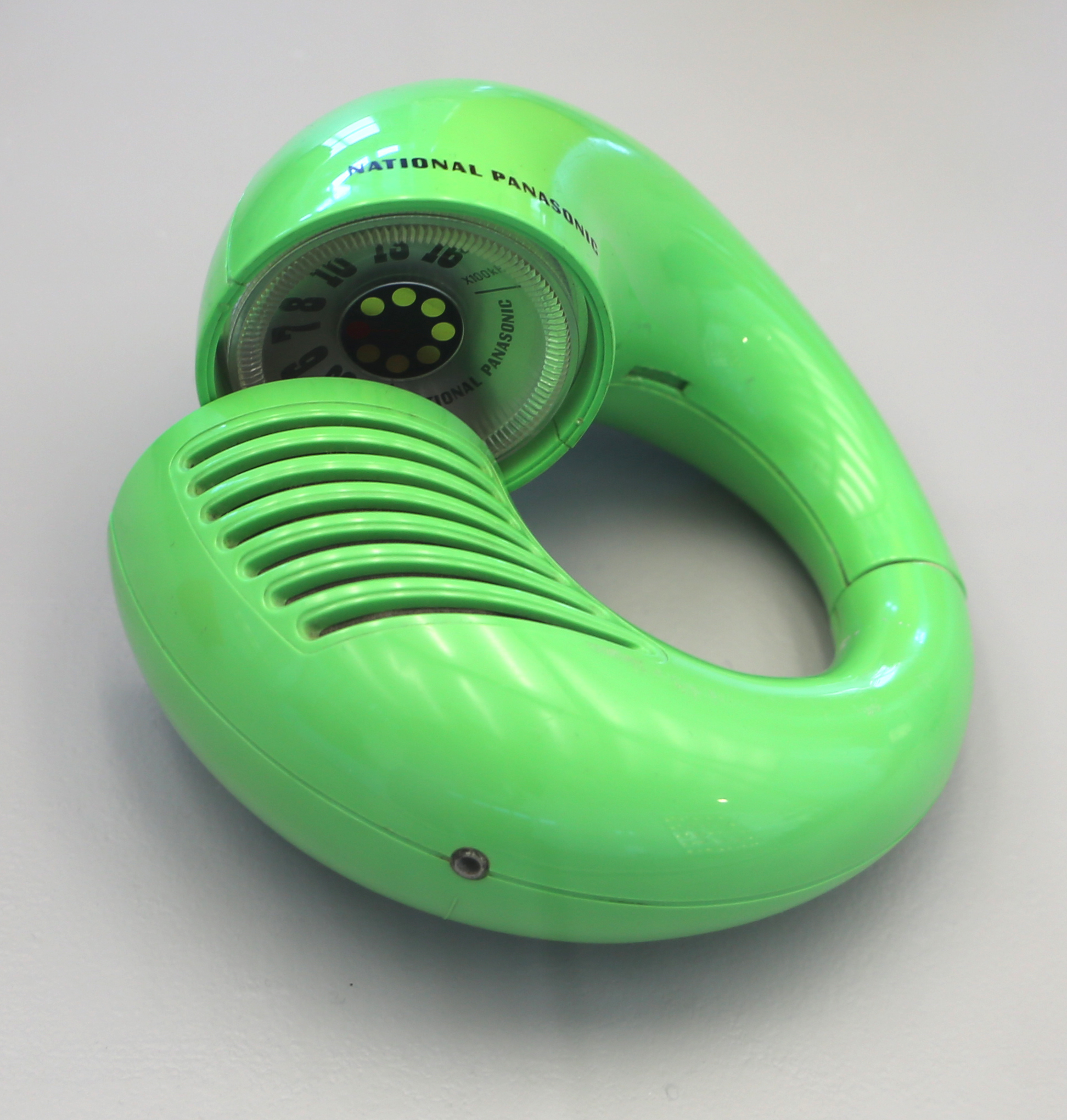
The Panasonic Toot-a-Loop Radio

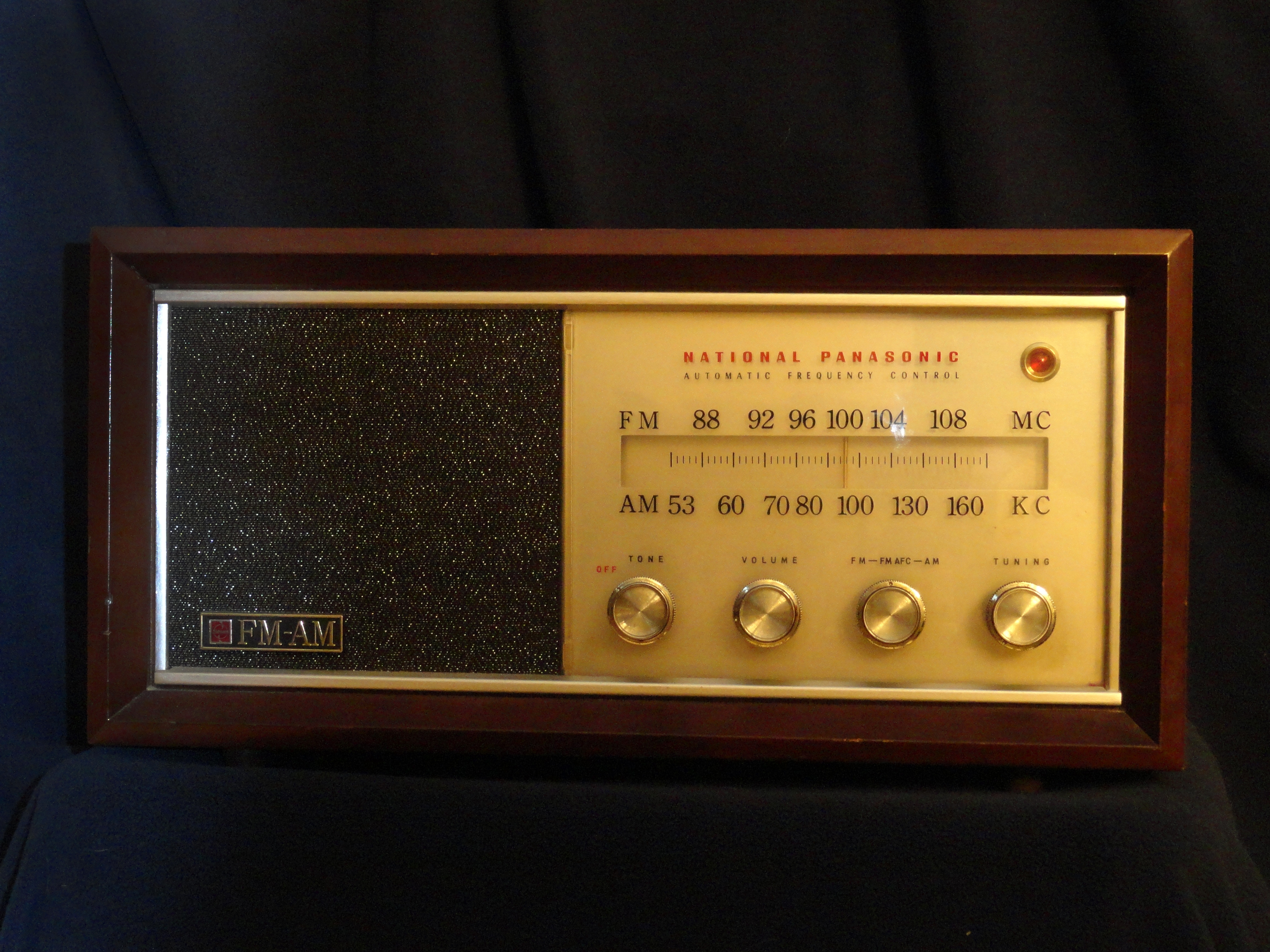
The front of a National Panasonic Model RE-784A with a walnut veneer

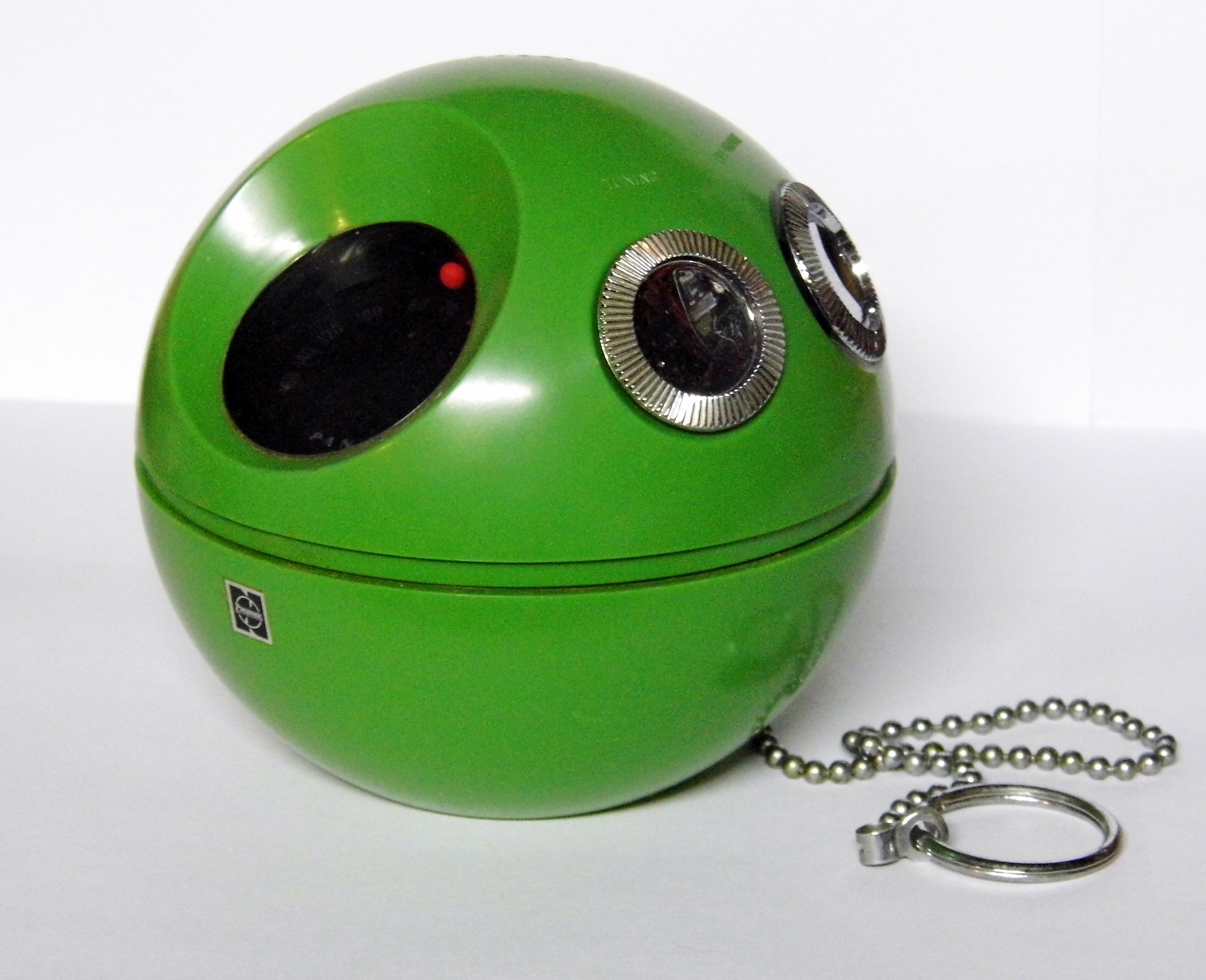
The Panapet radio

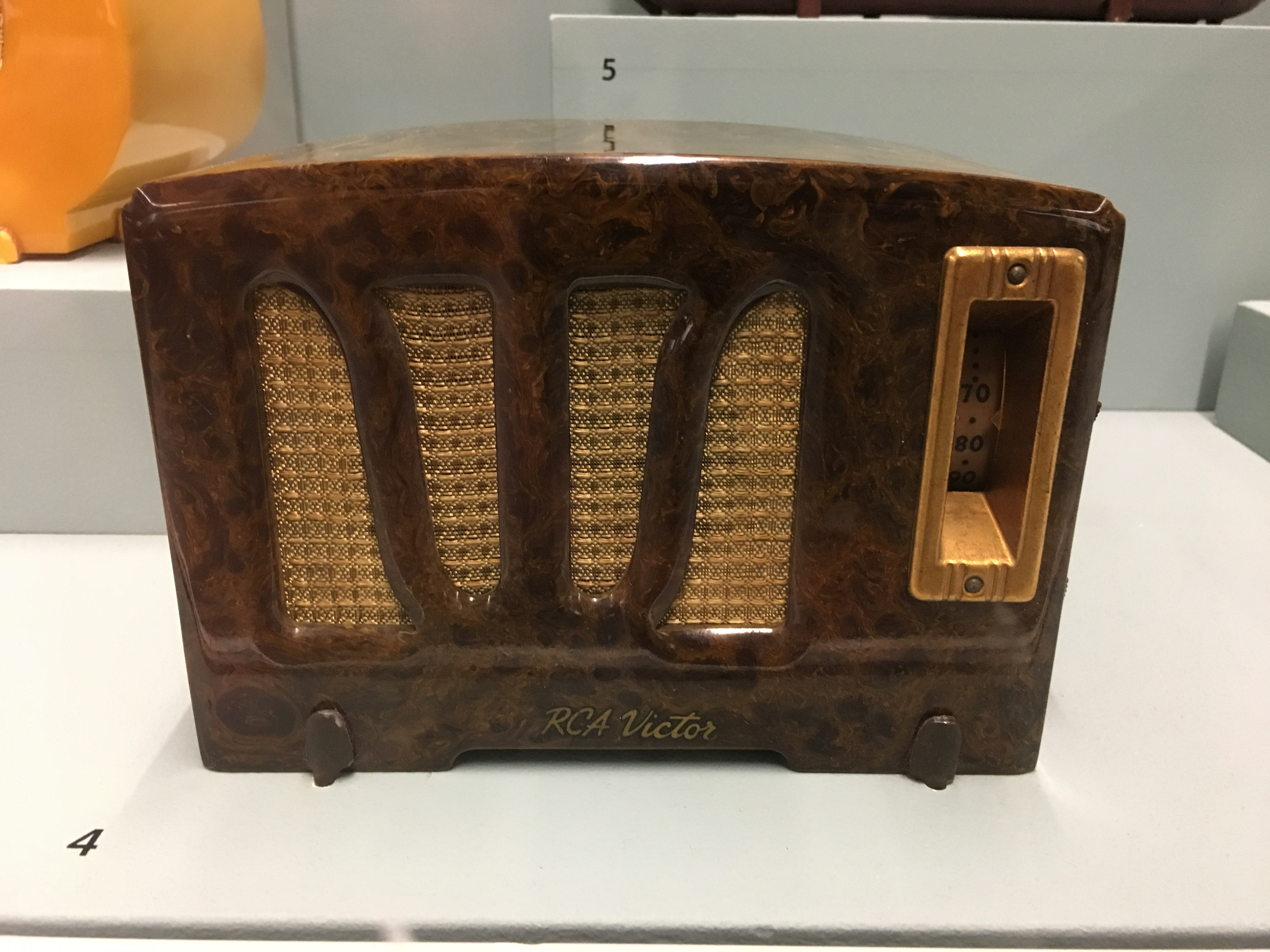
A 1938 RCA Victor Model RC-350-A radio, made of catalin and bakelite

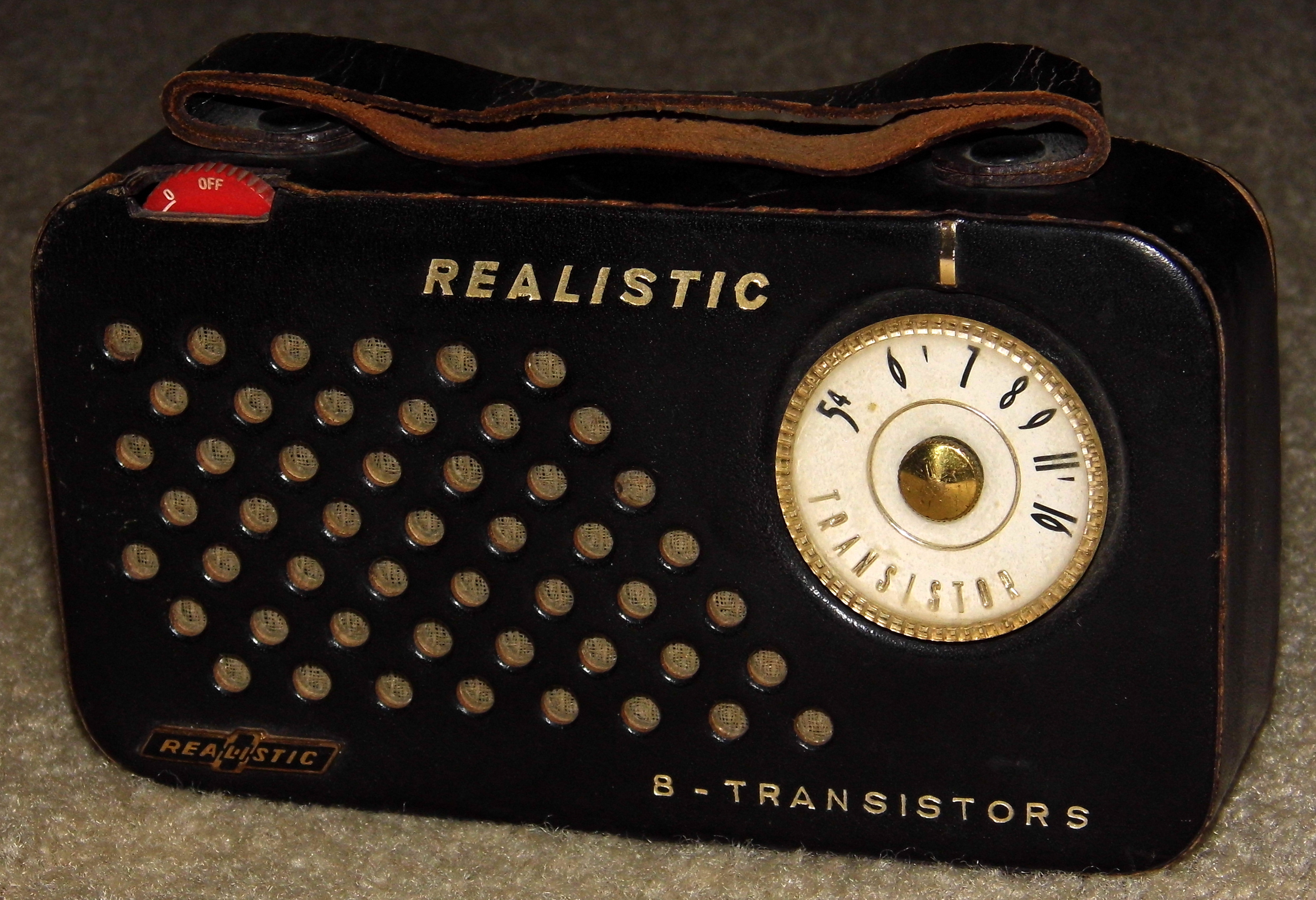
A Realistic-brand Realistic 8 leather-cased transistor radio, circa 1959

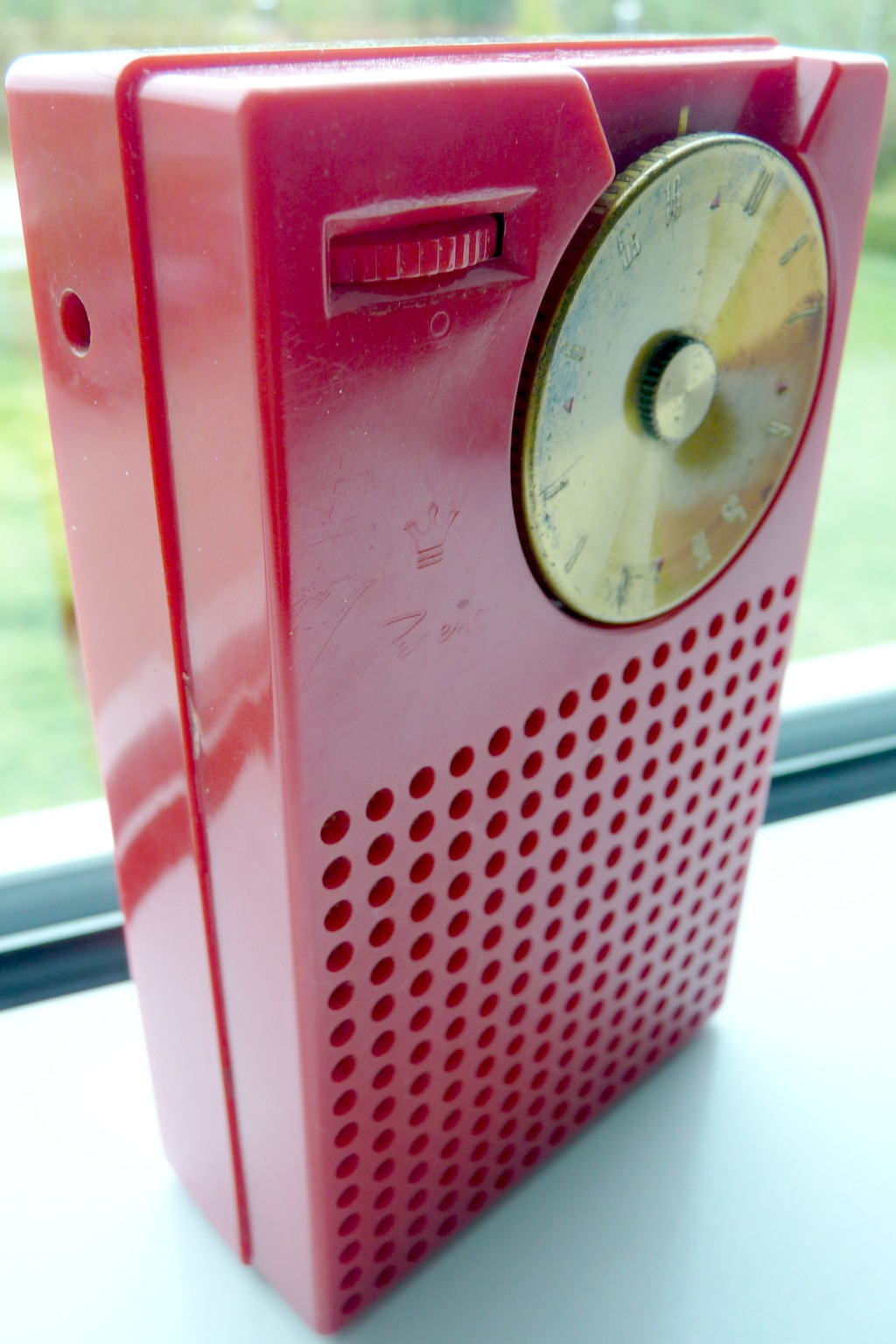
A Regency TR-1 transistor radio

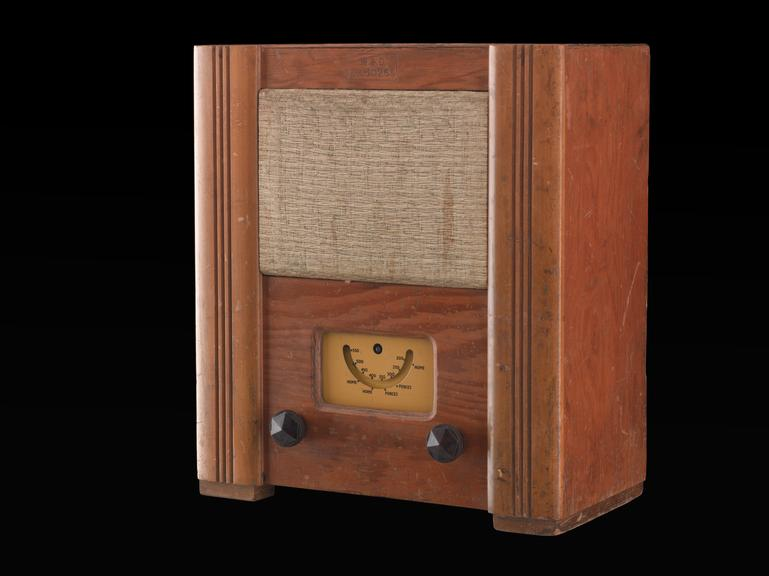
The Utility Radio

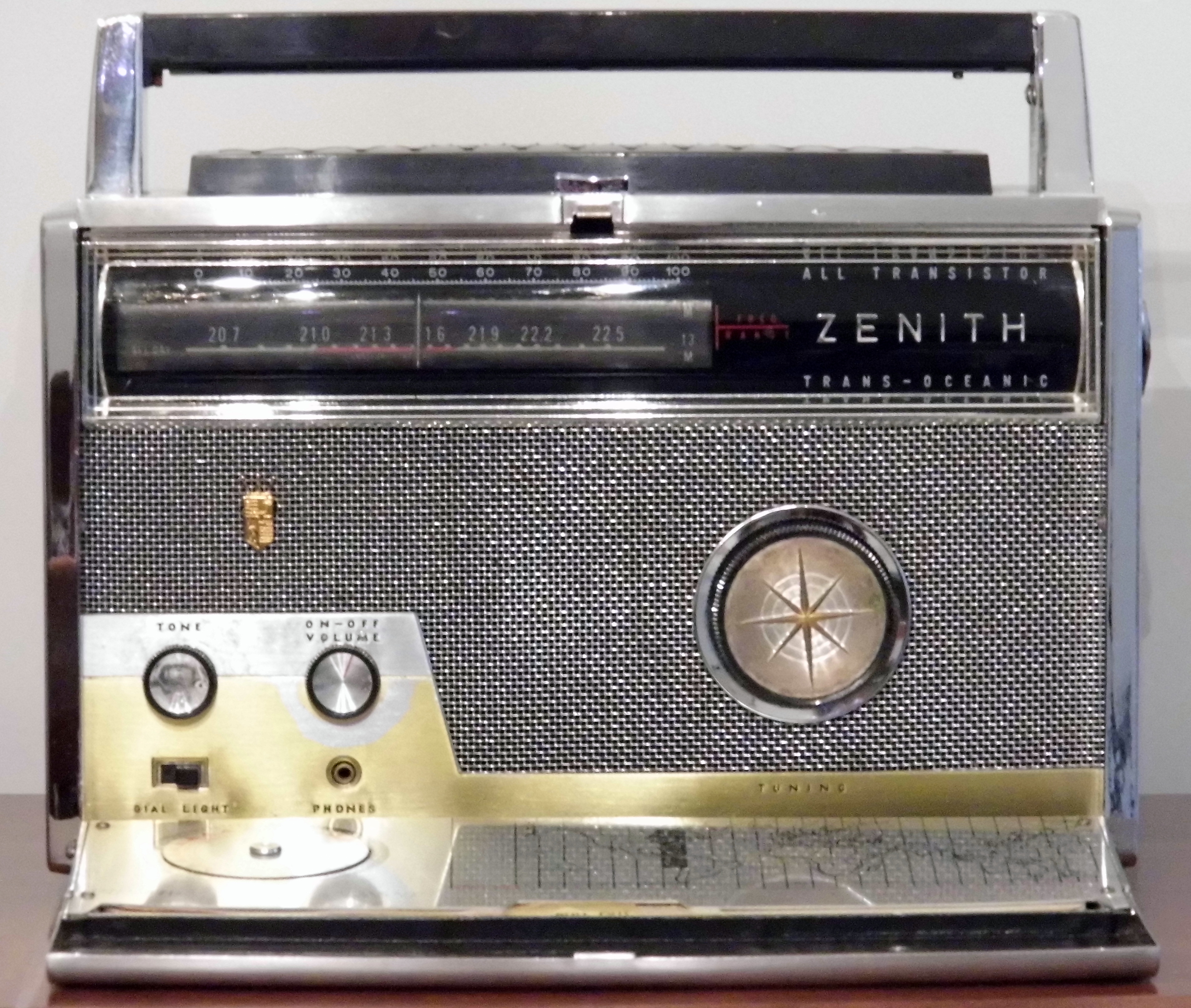
Zenith Trans-Oceanic

== Military radios ==
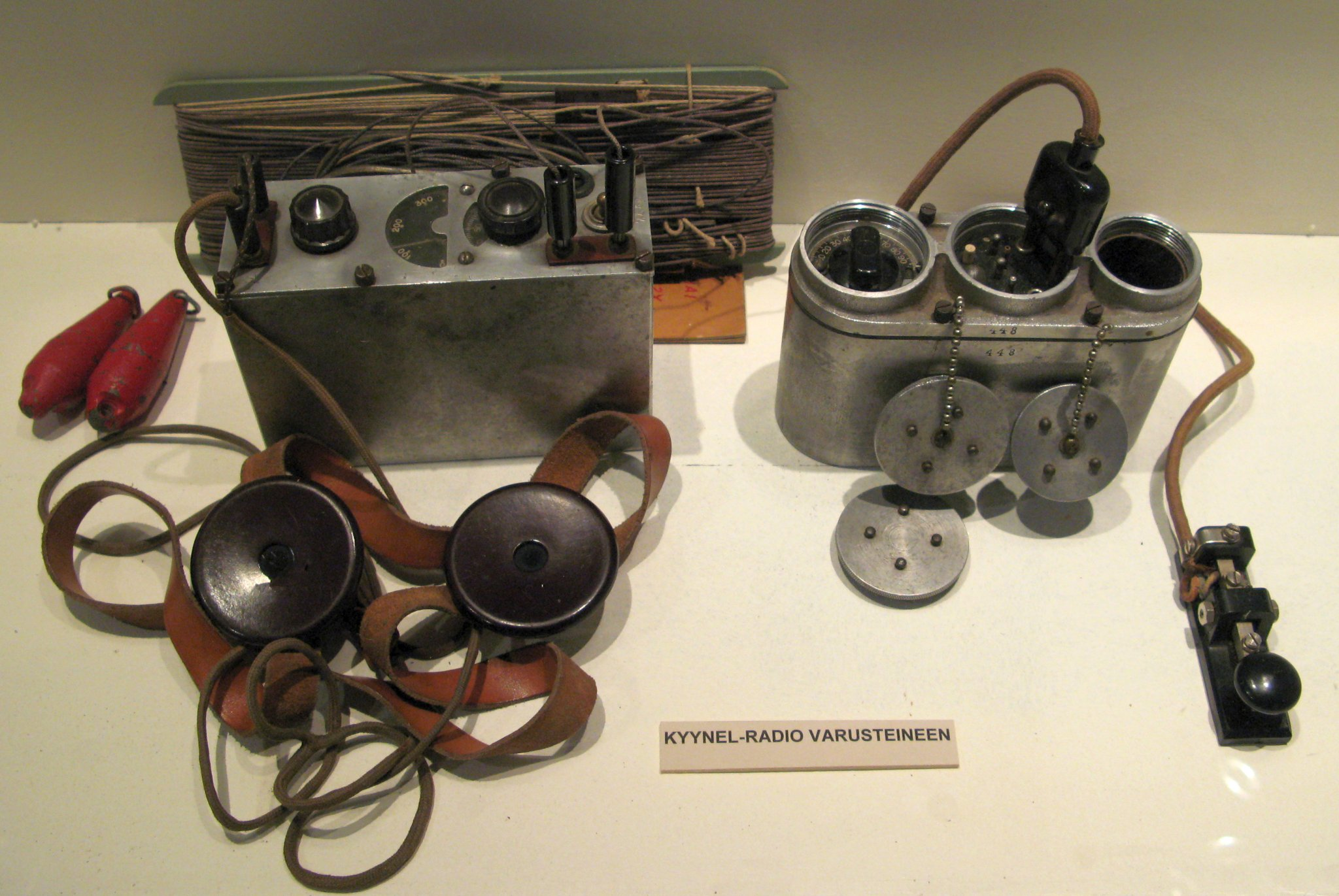
Kyynel M-5 lightweight clandestine military radio transmitter developed in Finland

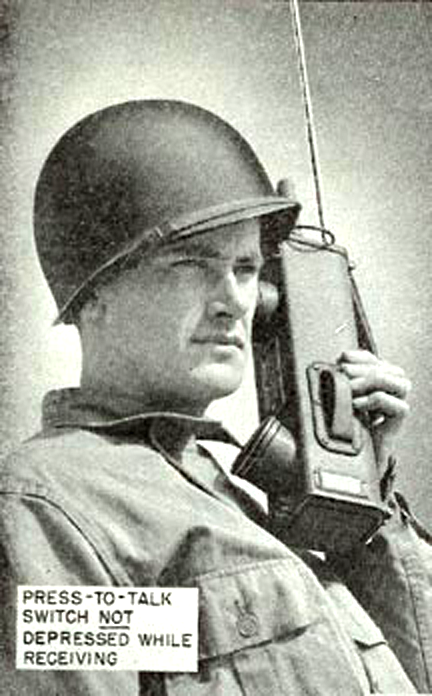
An SCR-536 "handie talkie" of the U.S. Army Signal Corps

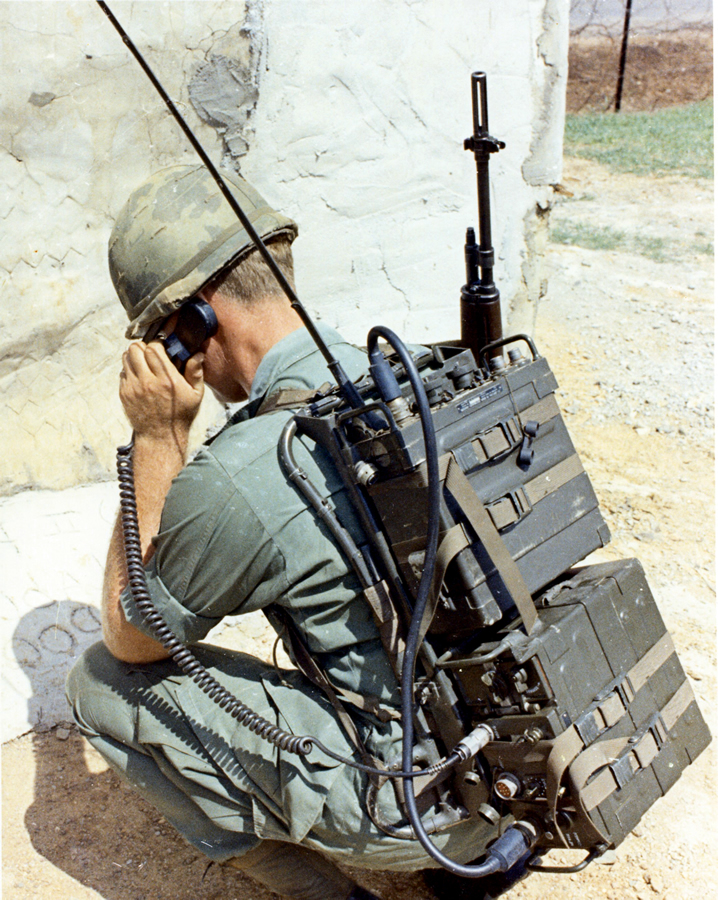
American soldier using the KY-38 "man-pack", part of the NESTOR voice encryption system that was used during the Vietnam War. The upper unit is an AN/PRC-77 radio transceiver. The combined weight of the units, 54 pounds (24.5 kg), proved an obstacle to their use in combat.

- A-7 – a Soviet VHF radio transceiver (later models include the A-7a and A-7b) that was developed during World War II and used for communication in rifle brigades and regiments. The complete station was designed to be transported by an individual soldier.
- AN/PRC-77 Portable Transceiver –a manpack, portable VHF FM combat-net radio transceiver manufactured by Associated Industries and used to provide short-range, two-way radiotelephone voice communication. In the Joint Electronics Type Designation System (JETDS), AN/PRC translates to "Army/Navy, Portable, Radio, Communication."
- AN/ARC-5 – a series of radio receivers, transmitters, and accessories carried aboard U.S. Navy aircraft during World War II and for some years afterward. It is described as "a complete multi-channel radio transmitting and receiving set providing communication and navigation facilities for aircraft.
- AN/PRC-6 – a walkie-talkie used by the U.S. military in the late Korean War era through the Vietnam War
- Army No. 108 Wireless Set – was a wireless radio transceiver used by the Australian Army during World War II. The unit was based on the Wireless Set No. 18 and was modified during its production forming 3 different variants: Mk1, Mk2 and Mk3.
- Army No. 208 Wireless Set – was a wireless radio transceiver used by the Australian Army during World War II. Developed in 1941, the unit was based on the Army No. 108 Wireless Set and manufactured by AWA. There were three versions, the 208, 208* and the 208 Mark II. The 208 could be carried, but not operated, in a backpack.
- Clansman (military radio) – the name of a combat net radio system (CNR) used by the British Army from 1976 to 2010, it was developed by the Signals Research and Development Establishment (SRDE) in the 1960s, to satisfy a General Staff Requirement (GSR) laid down in 1965. It represented a considerable advance over existing Larkspur radio system, and proved to be more flexible, reliable and far lighter, and also allowed the introduction of Single SideBand (SSB) operation and NarrowBand Frequency Modulation (NBFM) to forward area combat net radio for the first time.
- FS-5000 HARPOON – a modular, fully digital clandestine spy radio developed between 1985 and 1988 by AEG Telefunken in Germany for Cold War stay-behind (Gladio) networks.
- Larkspur radio system – was the retrospectively adopted name of a tactical radio system used by the British Army. Its development started in the late 1940s with the first equipment being issued in the mid-1950s. It remained in service until replaced by Clansman in the late-1970s although some elements of Larkspur were still in service well into the 1980s. It was widely exported to British Commonwealth armies and other friendly nations.
- Model 94 Mk6 – a miniature, single-valve portable VHF transceiver used by the Imperial Japanese Army during World War II.
- Paraset – a clandestine morse code transceiver air-dropped by the Special Operations Executive to underground resistance cells in occupied Europe.
- Personal Role Radio – a small UHF transmitter-receiver issued to the British Armed Forces. It is used by the British Army, Royal Marines, Royal Navy and the Royal Air Force Regiment. The radio has a range of 500 meters, weighs 1.5 kilograms, has 256 different radio channels and a battery life of 20 hours continuous use.
- PRC-999K – a portable radio transceiver of the Republic of Korea Army, it is usually used by Companies & Battalions. It is developed and built by LIG Nex1.
- R-390A – a general coverage HF radio communications receiver designed by Collins Radio Company for the United States Armed Forces
- R-105D – a VHF portable radio transceiver used by the Soviet military
- SCR-284 – was a World War II era combination transmitter and receiver used in vehicles or fixed ground stations.
- SCR-300 – was a portable radio transceiver used by United States Army Signal Corps in World War II. This backpack-mounted unit was the first radio to be nicknamed a "walkie talkie".
- SCR-536 – a hand-held radio transceiver used by the United States Army Signal Corps during World War II, it is popularly referred to as a walkie talkie, although it was originally designated a "handie talkie". Today, the SCR-536 is often restored and operated by vintage amateur radio enthusiasts and military radio collectors.
- SCR-694 – a portable two way radio set used by the U.S. military during World War II.
- Wireless Set No. 19 – a Second World War mobile radio transceiver designed for use by armored troops of the British Army. First introduced in 1940, the No. 19 began to replace the pre-war Wireless Set No. 11.
- ZO-47 – a compact, modular, valve-based clandestine radio set developed by Philips in 1947, custom-built for O&I (Operatiën en Inlichtingen).
Military radios

An A-7 VHF transceiver

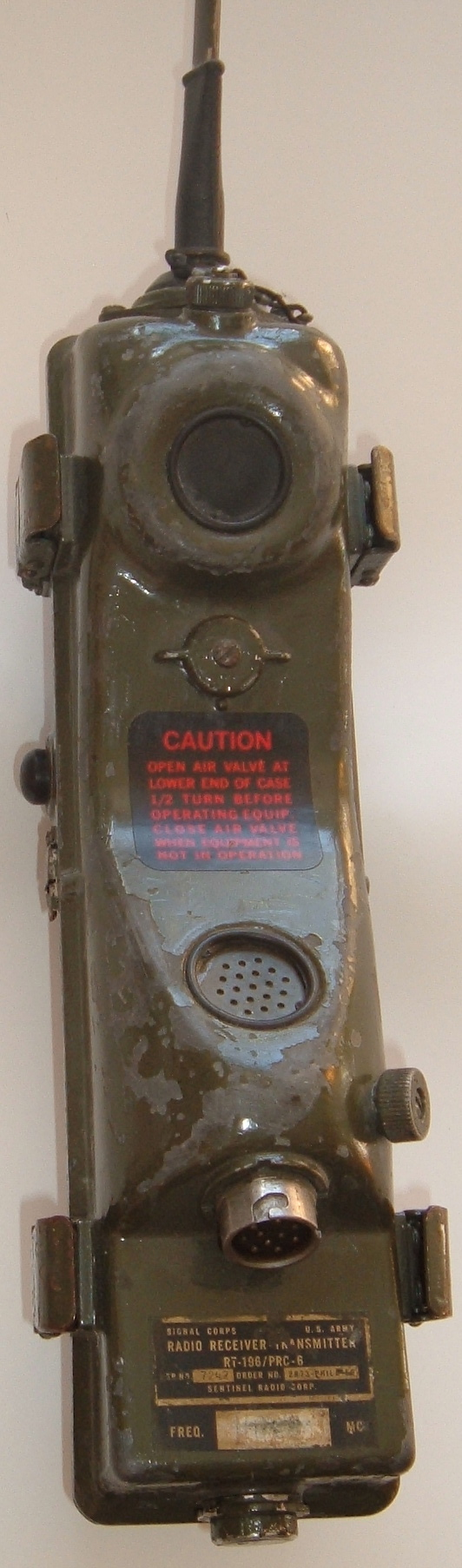
A AN/PRC-6 walkie talkie

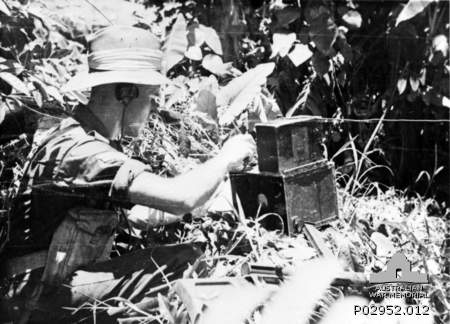
An unidentified Australian soldier operating an Army No. 208 Wireless Set in the jungle. This small and easy to set up wireless set was standard equipment for Commandos and Patrols.

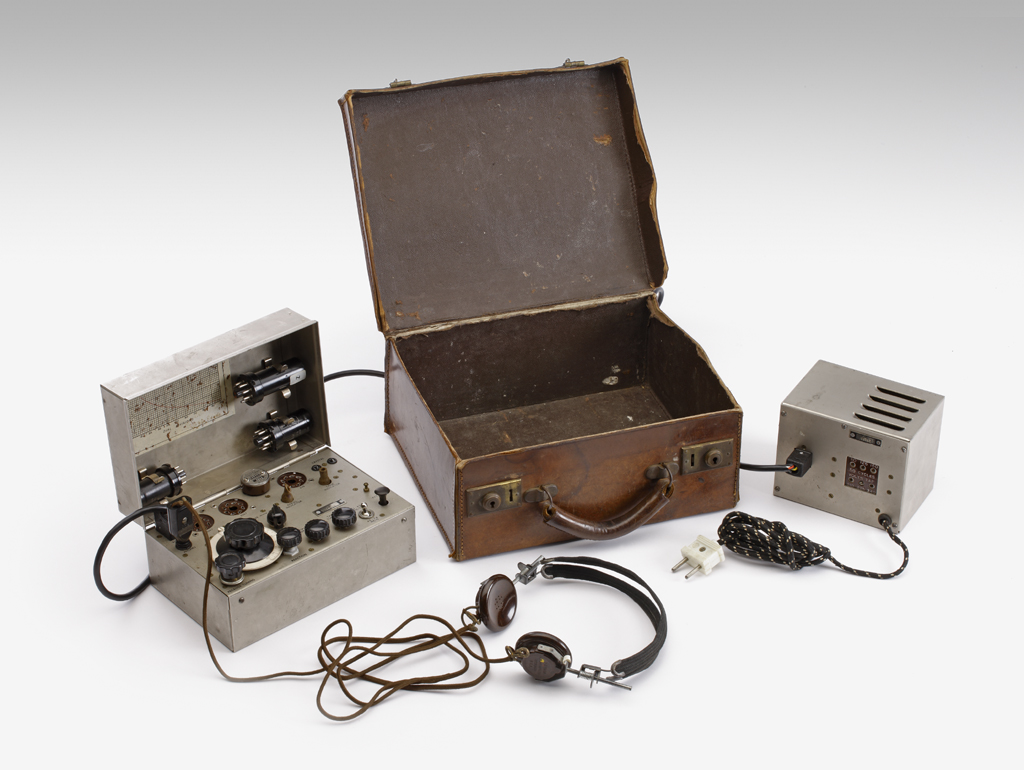
Paraset morse code transceiver.

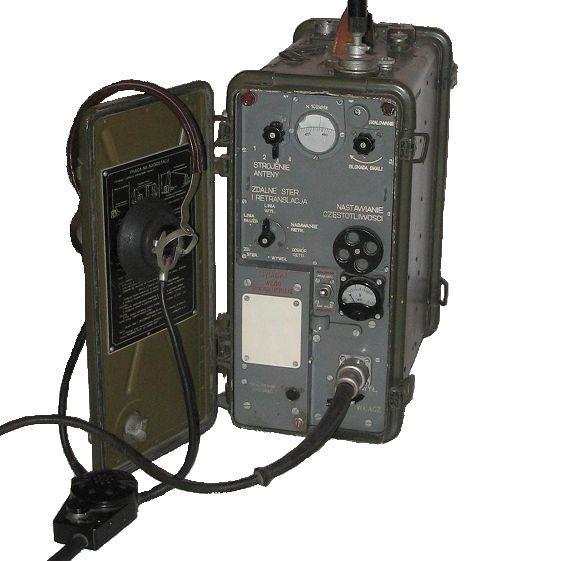
The R-105D is a VHF portable radio transceiver that was used by the Soviet military

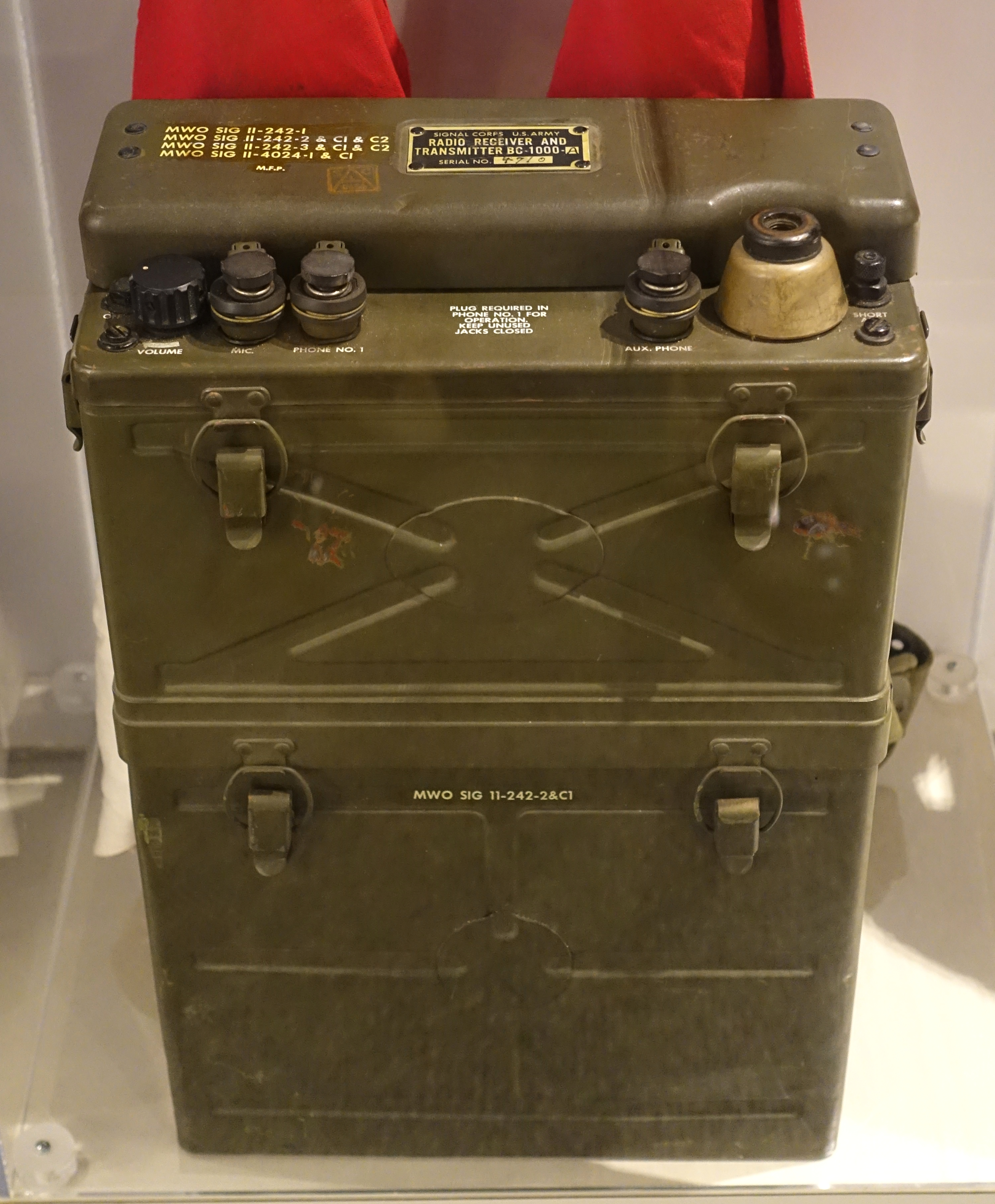
A Motorola SCR-300, circa 1940

A Belgian Army Mod 39 RP 39 portable radio transmitter on the sidecar of a Saroléa 38H motorbike

A C-9815/ARC-159(V) UHF radio in the rear cockpit of an F-4N Phantom

== See also ==
- Airband
- Antique radio
- Clandestine radio
- Golden Age of Radio
- History of radio
- List of communications receivers
- List of oldest radio stations
- List of VLF-transmitters
- Marine VHF radio
- Outline of radio
- Signal Corps Radio
- Space radio station
- Space radio system
- List of military electronics of the United States
