= R-105D =

Radio transceiver

R-105D Astra-3 (Р-105Д Астра-3) is a VHF portable radio transceiver used by the Soviet military.

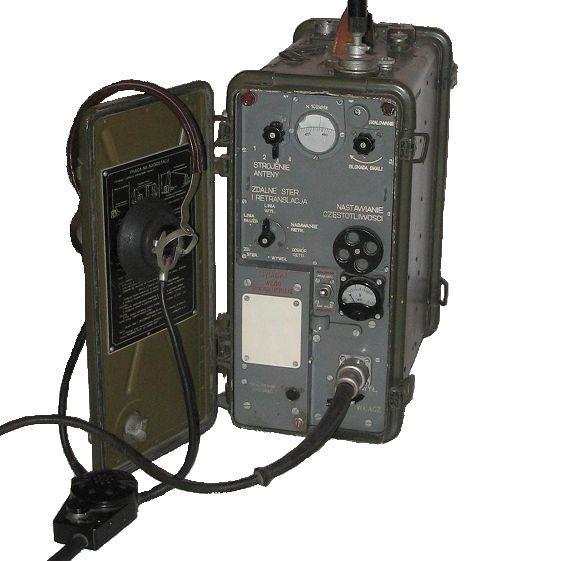
R-105D transceiver

The first prototype of the Astra (Астра) series of radio transceivers was developed in the late 1940s at the Scientific Research and Test Institute for Communications of the Army (NIIIS SV) as a replacement for the A-7 series radio sets. They entered service with the Soviet armed forces in 1952. It was superseded by the R-105M Parus-3 (P-105M Парус-3) set in 1967.

== Technical specifications ==
- FM, superheterodyne radio transceiver based on valve circuitry. The tuning scale is calibrated in 50 kHz increments.
- Frequency range:
  - R-105D (Р-105Д) - 36.0 to 46.1 MHz (used by motorized infantry and tank troops)
  - R-108D (P-108Д) - 28.0 to 36.5 MHz (version used by artillery units)
  - R-109D (P-109Д) - 21.5 to 28.5 MHz (HF band variant used by the air defense forces)
- Receiver sensitivity: better than 1.5 μV at a signal-to-noise ratio of 10:1
- Transmitter output power: 1 Watt
- Power source: two nickel-cadmium batteries 2NKN-24 or 2KN-32 with a total voltage of 4.8 V. HT supply to the anode circuits is from a built-in vibration transducer.
- Battery endurance: Continuous operation time at a 3:1 ratio of reception/transmission time is from 12 to 17.5 hours depending on the type of battery fitted.
- Antenna: flexible whip antenna 1.5 m high (Kulikov's pin type) with additional bends for extension up to 2.7 m. External antennas can also be used.
- Range: 10 km when using a short whip antenna, and 30-40 km when using more complex antennas.
- Operating temperature range: -40 to +50 °C
- Dimensions of transceiver: 365 × 385 × 230 mm
- Weight: 21 kg
