= Bone Fone =

Wearable audio speakers that employ bone conduction

The Bone Fone was a wearable radio that draped around the user's neck like a scarf. Bill Hass invented the device, and JS&A marketed it in 1979. According to the marketing materials, the Bone Fone resonated sound through the wearer's bones.

The device represents an evolutionary step from hand-held electronics (transistor radios) to wearable technology (Walkman, iPod, smart phone). The Bone Fone did not achieve the longevity of transistor radios, originating in 1947, and surviving to the present. The Sony Walkman line achieved greater popularity; iPods and smartphones achieved greater impact. But, the Bone Fone helped make the transition to products users could wear, freeing the hands for other activities, such as exercise or gardening. In late 2019, Sony introduced a similar, though much less-rugged product, the SRS-WS1 Wearable Neck Speaker.

== See also ==
- Astraltune
- List of radios – List of specific models of radios
