= Regency TR-1 =

1954 commercial transistor radio

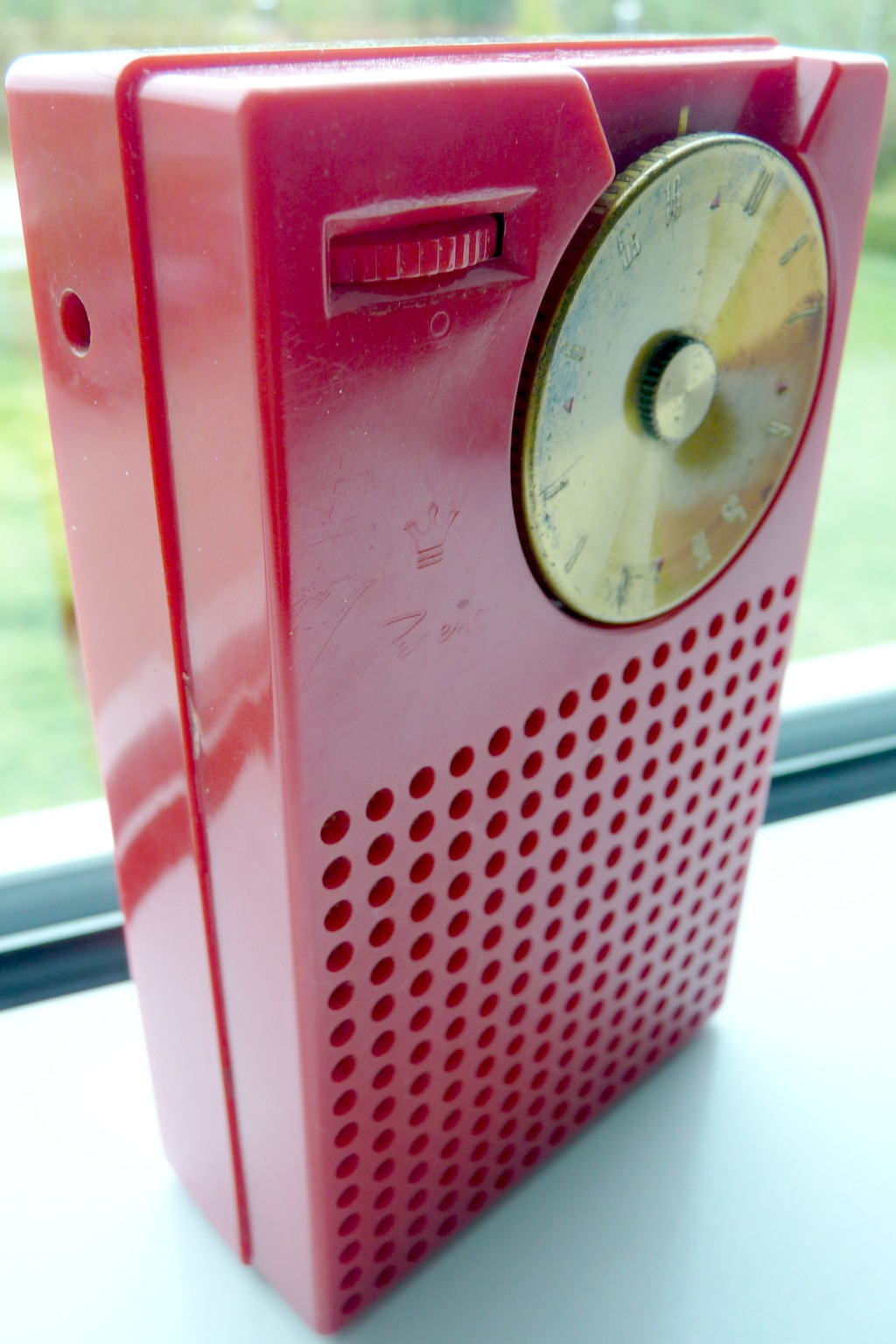
Regency TR-1 transistor radio

The Regency TR-1 was the first commercially manufactured transistor radio, introduced in 1954. About 150,000 units were sold, due to the novelty of its small size and portability. Previously, transistors had only been used in military or industrial applications, and the TR-1 was the first to demonstrate their utility in consumer electronics. As a pioneering product of its time, surviving specimens are highly sought after by collectors.

== Conception ==
Bell Labs made the first working transistor in 1947. Despite its much smaller size and power usage compared to the vacuum tube, by 1954 the transistor had not replaced tubes in consumer electronics except in hearing aids, because of the new component's high cost of $20, compared to $1 for a tube.

In May 1954, Texas Instruments (TI), previously a producer of instrumentation for the oil industry and locating devices for the US Navy, wanted an established radio manufacturer to develop and market a radio using TI's transistors. No major radio maker, including RCA, Philco, and Emerson, was interested. Previous vacuum tube-based pocket radios had been unsuccessful; some companies made their own transistors and did not want to use TI's. Ed Tudor, the president of Industrial Development Engineering Associates, (I.D.E.A), a builder of home antenna boosters, jumped at the opportunity to manufacture the TR-1, predicting sales of the transistor radios would be "20 million radios in three years". Many Americans were building bomb shelters, and the company expected that they would want a pocket-sized radio for emergencies.

TI was not interested in manufacturing radios; its goal was to increase demand for its transistors so that the per-unit price would decrease from $10–15. The Regency division of I.D.E.A announced the TR-1 on October 18, 1954, and put it on sale in New York and Los Angeles on 1 November 1954.

== Design ==
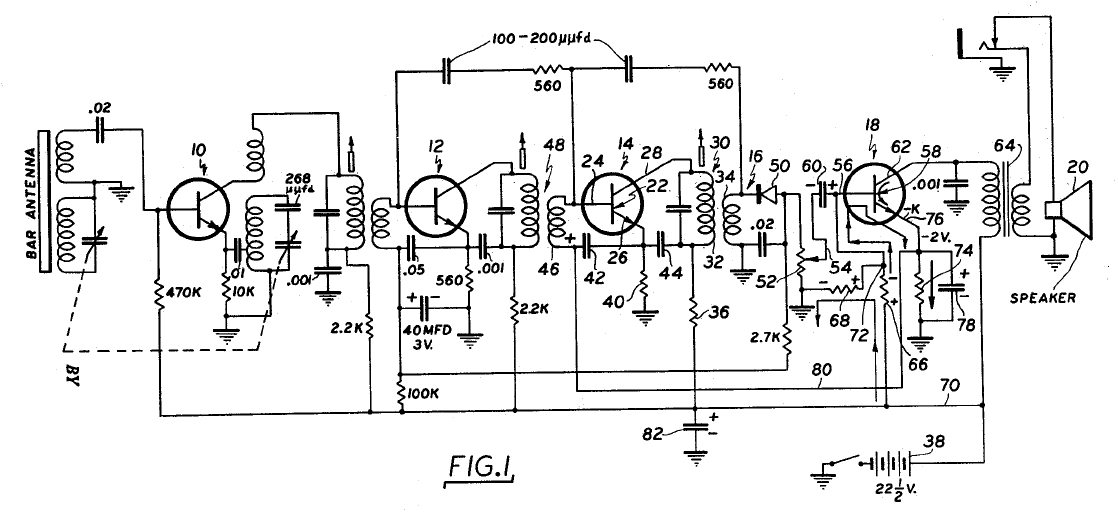
Regency TR1 schematic circuit diagram

The original TI prototype used eight transistors; when the company met with I.D.E.A. it used six. The Regency TR-1 circuitry was refined from the TI design, reducing the number of parts and cutting the number of expensive transistors to just four. Although this severely reduced audio output volume, it let I.D.E.A. keep the price down to $49.95, ($510 in 2021), which was a significant amount of money for such a small, untried object.

=== Aesthetics ===
I.D.E.A. outsourced the TR-1 exterior design to the industrial design firm of Painter, Teague and Petertil. The design was created within six weeks by way of telephone and design sketches exchanged by mail. The design won an award from the Industrial Design Society of New York and was selected by the Museum of Modern Art for the American Art and Design Exhibition in Paris in 1955.

The TR-1 was initially offered in black, bone white, mandarin red, and cloud gray, it was later uncommonly offered in olive green, mahogany, and eventually in rare colors including lavender, pearl white, turquoise, pink, and lime. It was advertised as measuring 3" × 5" × 1.25" (7.62 × 12.7 × 3.2 cm) and weighed 12 ounces (340 g) including the 22.5 volt battery. It came in a cardboard box with the color stamped on the end. An optional earphone sold for $7.50.

The red triangles on the frequency dial mark the CONELRAD frequencies of 640 and 1240 kHz.

=== Technical design ===
The TR-1 uses TI's NPN transistors, hand-picked in sets of four. A 22.5 volt battery provides power, since the only way to get adequate radio frequency performance out of early transistors was to run them close to their collector-to-emitter breakdown voltage. The current drain from this battery is only 4 mA, allowing 20 to 30 hours of operation, in comparison to only several hours for the portable receivers based on vacuum tubes. The Regency TR-1 was patented by Richard C. Koch, Project Engineer at I.D.E.A.

==== Circuit ====
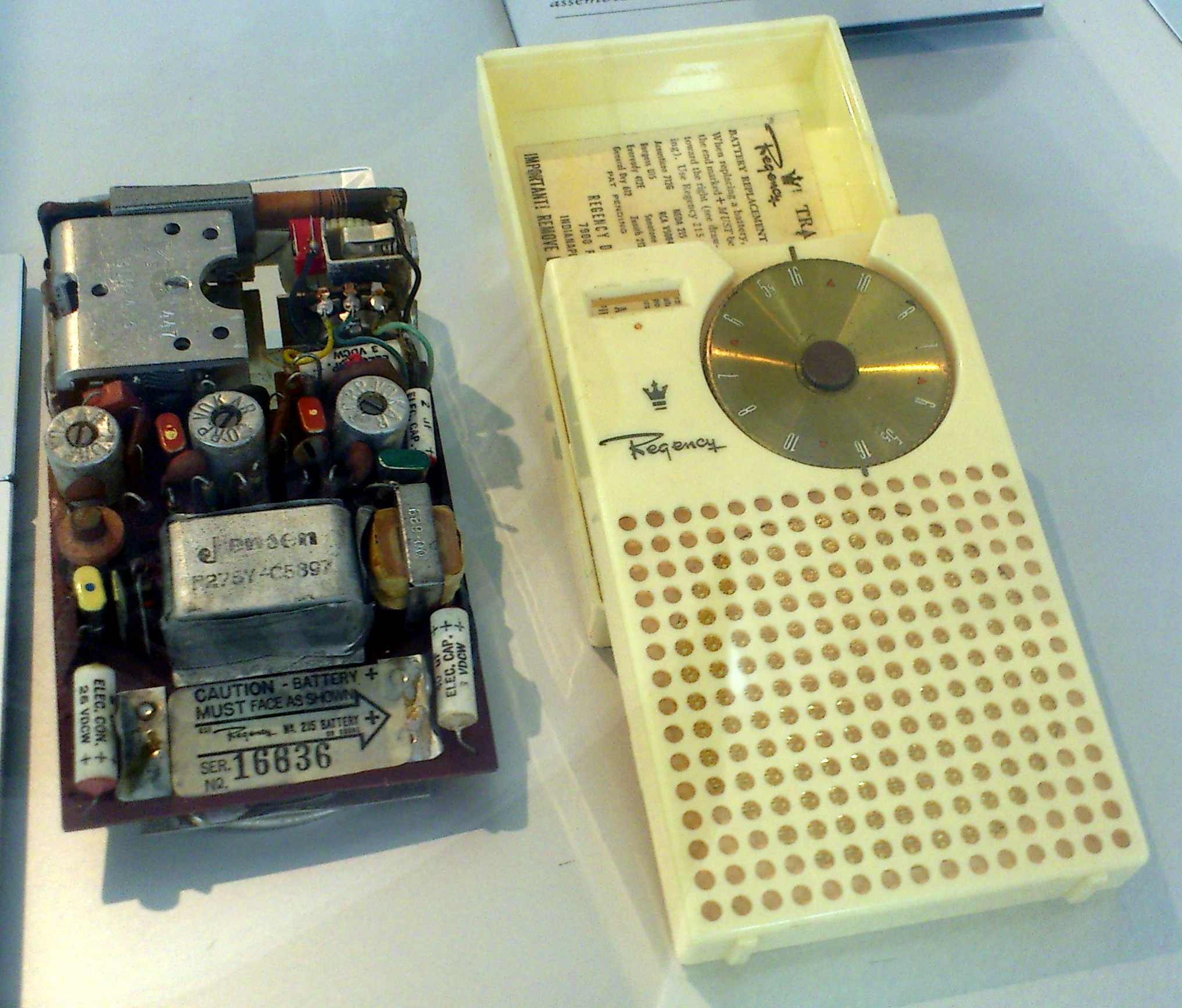
TR-1, circuit board and casing. Exhibit of Deutsches Museum, Munich.

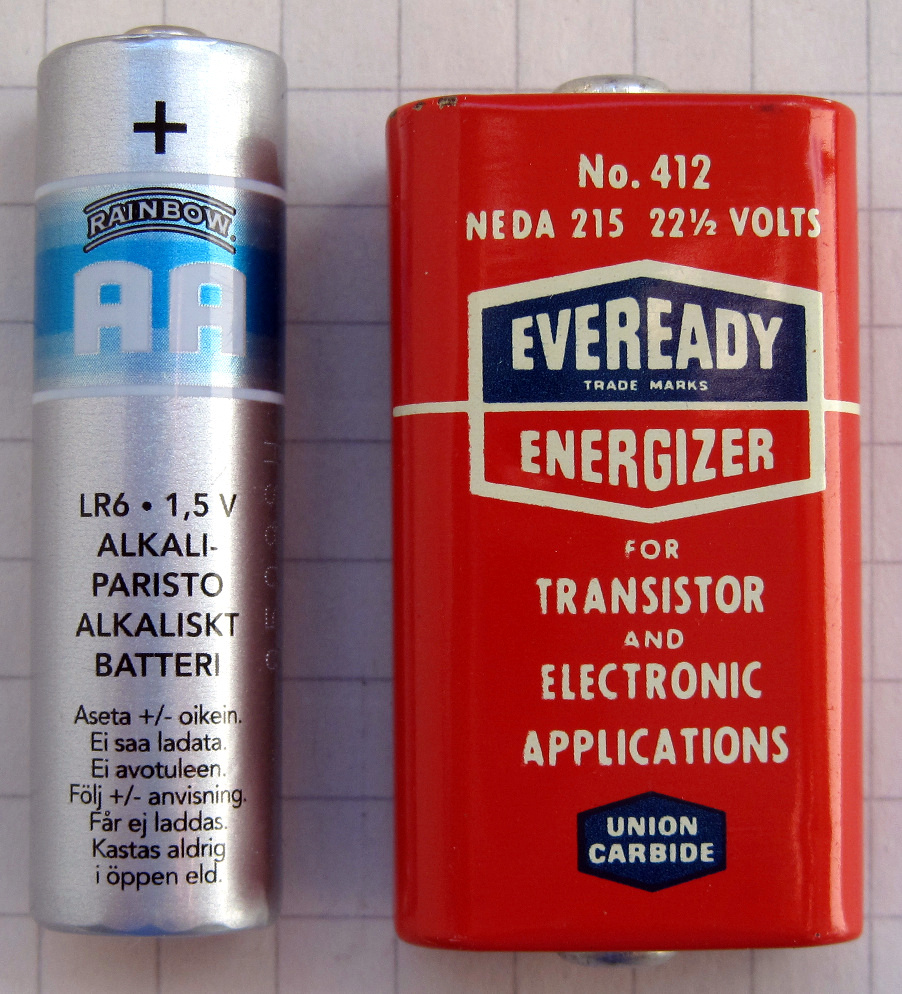
22.5 Volt battery used in the Regency TR-1 (AA battery for comparison shown on left)

The TR-1 is a superheterodyne receiver with four n-p-n germanium transistors and one diode. It contains a single transistor converter stage, followed by two intermediate-frequency amplifier stages. After detection, a single-transistor stage amplifies the audio frequency. All amplifier stages use common emitter amplifiers. Stages are transformer coupled, with tuned transformers for the intermediate frequency amplifiers and a miniature audio transformer for the loudspeaker. The intermediate frequency transformers are paired with capacitors, and hand tuned to the intermediate frequency (262 kHz) using movable cores.

The circuit was designed so as to get the maximum possible gain out of the first three transistors (which operated at radio frequencies). The first transistor used as a frequency converter was operated very close to its V_{CBO} of 30 volts (from the 22.5 volt battery). This gives a larger depletion layer between the collector and the base which reduces the parasitic feedback due to the Miller effect and extends the frequency range. A lower voltage, however, will reduce the depletion layer width, increasing the collector-base feedback capacitance. This has an unusual effect. Because the intermediate frequency (IF) amplifier chain (called the IF strip) is neutralised at the *expected* values of feedback capacitance, the TR-1's IF strip will break into oscillation at low battery voltages. On test, this occurred below about 16 volts. The two intermediate frequency amplifier transistors are neutralised to cancel out their parasitic Miller effect feedback which also extends their frequency range. Replacement transistors were supplied with the correct neutralising capacitor of 100–200 pF.

The receiver has automatic gain control. The DC level of the detected signal is filtered with a large capacitor and used to control the gain of the first IF stage.

The 22.5 V battery, while now uncommon, is still used in some devices and as of 2020 remains available on the market. The minimum required voltage is lower, about 15 V, below which the radio oscillates. An electrolytic capacitor is connected in parallel to the battery to improve stability. The power switch is coupled with the volume control.

== Manufacture ==
Regency began assembling the TR-1 on October 25, 1954, supervising a collective effort by manufacturers around the United States.

- Transistors and transformers came from Texas Instruments of Dallas, Texas.
- IF transformers came from Vokar of Dexter, Michigan.
- Tuning capacitor came from Radio Condenser of Camden, New Jersey.
- Capacitors came from International Electronics of Nashville, Tennessee, Erie Electronics of Erie, Pennsylvania, and Centralab of Milwaukee, Wisconsin.
- Germanium diode came from Tungsol and Raytheon.
- Resistors came from unknown sources.
- Volume control came from the Chicago Telephone Supply of Elkhart, Indiana.
- Speaker came from Jensen of Chicago, Illinois.
- PCB material came from Richardson Company of Melrose Park, Illinois and Indianapolis, Indiana.
- Etched PCBs came from Croname of Chicago, Illinois.
- Plastic case came from Argus Plastics of Indianapolis, Indiana.

== Legacy ==
One year after the TR-1 release, sales approached 100,000 units. While the radio was praised for design aesthetics, novelty and small size, because of the cost-cutting measures, the sensitivity and sound quality were behind the established vacuum tube based competitors, and reviews were typically adverse. A review in Consumer Reports mentioned the high level of noise and instability on certain radio frequencies, and recommended against purchase, stating that while listening to speech was "adequate", music quality was unacceptable.

TI and I.D.E.A. did not disagree with the poor reviews, as they knew of the technical limitations resulting from only using four transistors. They did not know that Raytheon was working on a table radio using transistors; appearing in February 1955, the larger case allowed a design with six transistors, significantly improving sound quality. In August 1955 a small Japanese company released its first transistor radio, the TR-55; the company renamed itself Sony and became the world's dominant consumer radio manufacturer.

== See also ==
- List of radios – List of specific models of radios
