= TR-55 =

First commercial transistor radio

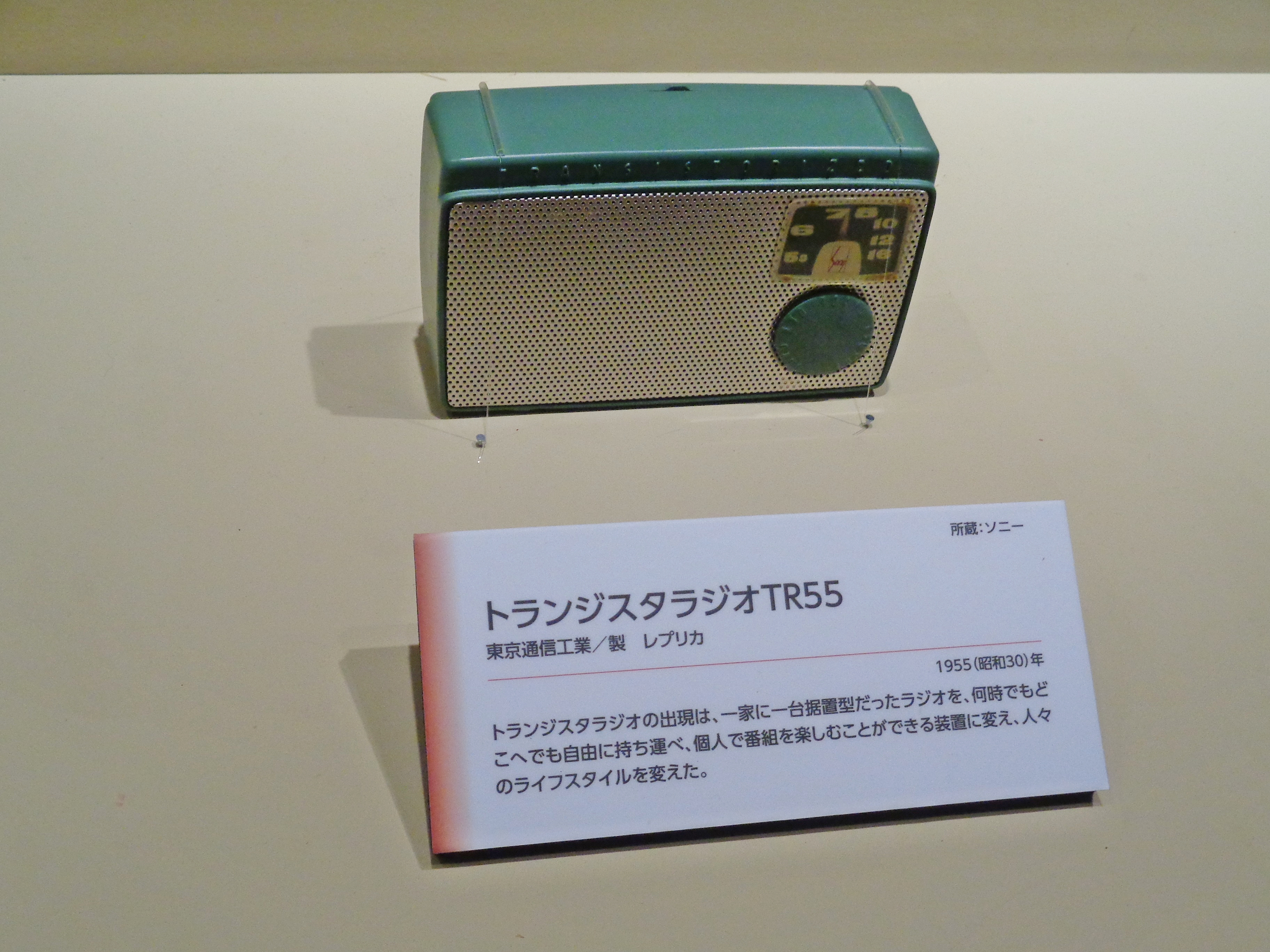
TR-55 Transistor Radio by Sony

The TR-55, released in 1955, was both Japan's and Sony's first commercially available transistor radio. The use of transistors allowed the device to be much smaller than earlier vacuum tube radios.

== History ==
Akio Morita and Masaru Ibuka, then operating under the business name Tokyo Tsushin Kogyo, had been working on plans to introduce a transistor radio to the market since 1953. The first model, released in 1955, was called TR-52, but was pulled from the market before it had even been introduced after climbing summer temperatures made the front lattice section gradually peel away from the black cabinet, forcing the company to build a new model using a more durable material. When the TR-55 was released in Japan in August 1955, it was the first transistor radio marketed in that country. The TR-55 featured the Sony name, but the company did not officially change its name to Sony until January 1958.

In the autumn of 1955, Morita met with a representative of the Bulova watch company in New York City. Bulova agreed to order 10,000 units on the condition they carry the Bulova name. Morita declined the deal. Sony later signed a deal with New York importer Adolph Gross to distribute an improved and slightly more compact model, and in March 1957, the Sony TR-63 transistor radio would become Sony's first product sold in the US. The TR-63 would not fit in existing shirt front pockets, so the company issued shirts with expanded pockets to salesmen so they could claim the product was "the world's first pocket sized transistor radio".

== Technical specifications ==
Powered by four AA batteries, the TR-55 used a superheterodyne circuit incorporating two AF stages and covered the medium wave broadcast band. The TR-55 used the following transistors:

- (1) 2T51 (oscillator-mixer)
- (2) 2T52 (for IF)
- (1) 2T53 (AF driver)
- (1) 2T12

The TR-55's five transistors were designed in house by Sony, the technology having been licensed from Bell Labs. This made Sony the first company to produce commercial transistor radios from the ground up. American company Regency had launched their Regency TR-1 transistor radio earlier in 1954, but bought the transistors from Texas Instruments. Printed circuit boards were used, which was unusual for the time.

== Physical specifications ==
The speaker grille was made from punched aluminum, and its design was reportedly inspired by Lincoln Motor Company automobiles of the era. Although it was not as compact as originally intended, the relatively small size of the TR-55 was a novelty, and attracted the attention of Japanese consumers.

- Height: 140 mm (5.5 in)
- Width: 89 mm (3.5 in)
- Thickness: 38 mm (1.5 in)
- Weight: 560 grams

== See also ==
- SRF-39
