= Model 94 Mk6 =

The Model 94 Mk 6 / Type 94 Mark 6 or 94-6 (九四式六号無線機) was a miniature, single-valve portable VHF transceiver used by the Imperial Japanese Army during World War II. Officially adopted in 1936, it was primarily issued as a short-range, man-portable radiotelephone for infantry communications and forward observer teams. Some captured sets were even reused by the Americans.

== See also ==
- List of radios
