= PD-3 =

The PD-3 is a rare, valve-based, spy radio transmitter developed around 1962 during the Cold War. Its origins remain shrouded in mystery, as the manufacturing country is officially unknown, though historical clues point toward British intelligence influence as almost all parts are British, which suggests that it might have been built by a commonwealth country, such as India, Hong Kong, or Singapore. Its components consist of 2x identically sized metal units: the main transmitter, a separate power supply unit (PSU) as well as externally fitted vacuum tubes (valves). Another variant, the PD-5 exists.

== See also ==
- List of radios
