= Nordmende =

German consumer electronics company

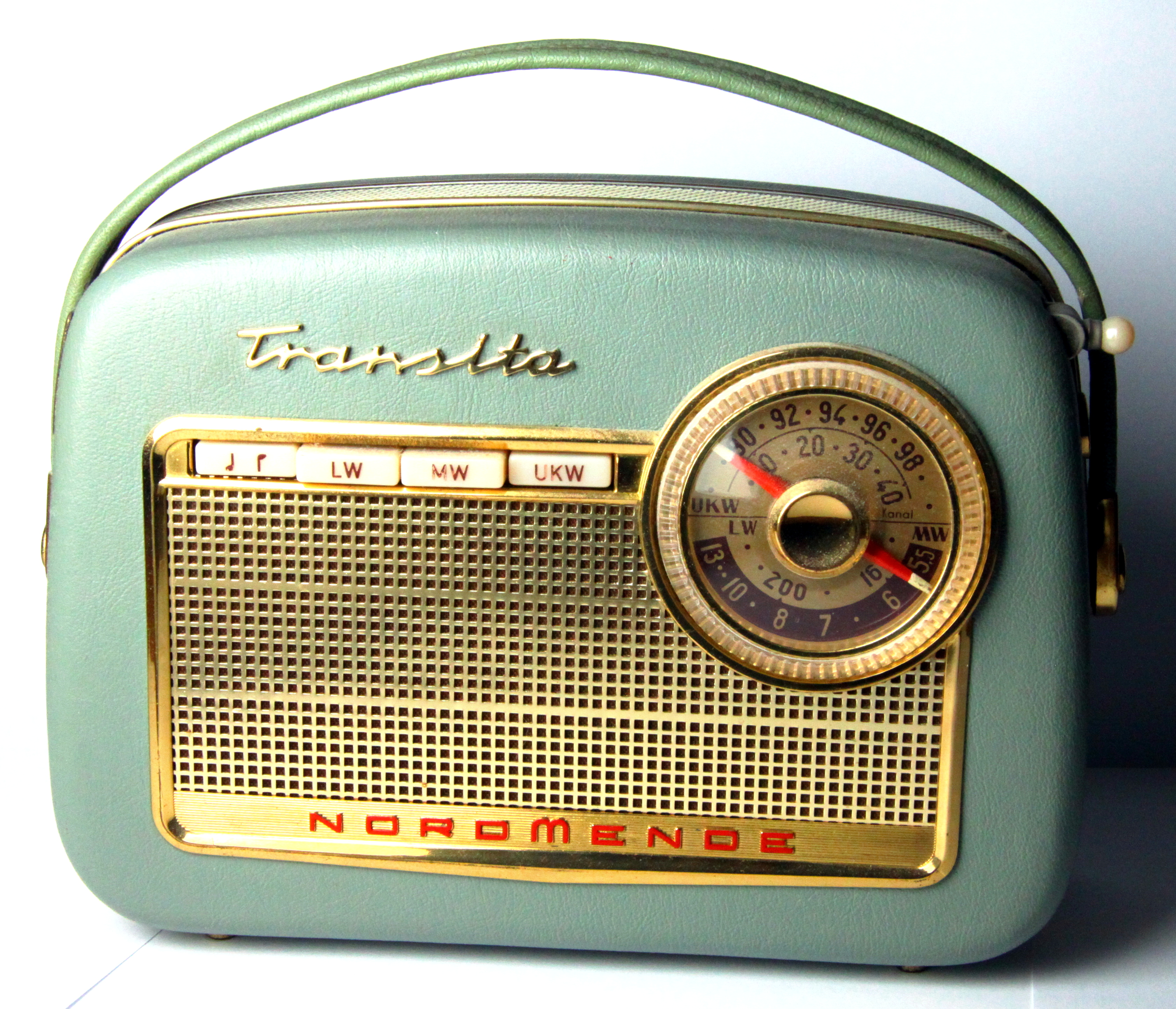
A Nordmende Transita radio

Nordmende, originally from Bremen, Germany, is a trademark owned by Technicolor SA. Nordmende was historically renowned as a major consumer electronics brand for high quality televisions and domestic appliances. The brand is now manufactured and distributed under licence in the United Kingdom, Ireland, Turkey and Italy.

== History ==
The original company, Radio N. Mende GmbH, was founded in 1923 by Otto Hermann Mende (1885-1940) in Dresden. Following the destruction of the plant during the bombing raids in 1945, Martin Mende (the founder's son) created a new company in Bremen in 1947, in a former Focke-Wulf plant, under the name Norddeutsche Mende-Rundfunk GmbH. The name was subsequently changed to Nordmende: subsequently the company became one of the prominent German manufacturers of radios, televisions, tape recorders and record players in the 1950s and 1960s.

In 1969, Mende's sons took over the company, and in 1977 a majority shareholding was sold to the French Thomson Brandt company. The following year, the family sold their remaining shares to Thomson. In the 1980s, the factories in Bremen were closed, Nordmende becoming purely a Thomson trademark.

At the same time, the Nordmende brand name was relaunched in Ireland in 2008 by the KAL Group. Although Nordmende was well known for its televisions throughout Ireland during the 1970s and 1980s, the company bought the rights to the name and launched a range of white goods including fridges, freezers, washing machines, and dishwashers, alongside a revamped range of flat-screen TVs and stereos.

On January 27, 2010, the Thomson company changed its name to Technicolor SA, re-branding the entire company after its American film technology subsidiary, the leading provider of services and products for the Media & Entertainment industry. Nowadays Technicolor is the global owner of the Nordmende brand (except in Ireland) and licences the brand to selected Consumer Electronics partners in Turkey, in Italy and in the UK. The brand still expands across Europe & other regions on various electronics segments (TV, Audio/Video, Small Appliances etc.)

== See also ==
- List of radios – List of specific models of radios
