= Army No. 208 Wireless Set =

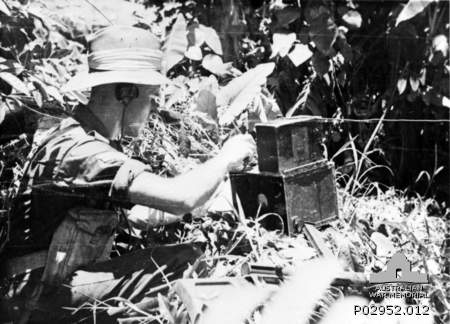
An unidentified Australian soldier operating an Army Wireless Set No. 208 wireless set in the jungle. This small and easy to set up wireless set was standard equipment for Commandos and Patrols.

The No. 208 Wireless Set was a wireless radio transceiver used by the Australian Army during World War II. Developed in 1941, the unit was based on the Army No. 108 Wireless Set and manufactured by AWA. There were three versions, the 208, 208* and the 208 Mark II. The 208 could be carried, but not operated, in a backpack.

== See also ==
- List of radios
