= National Panasonic Model RE-784A =

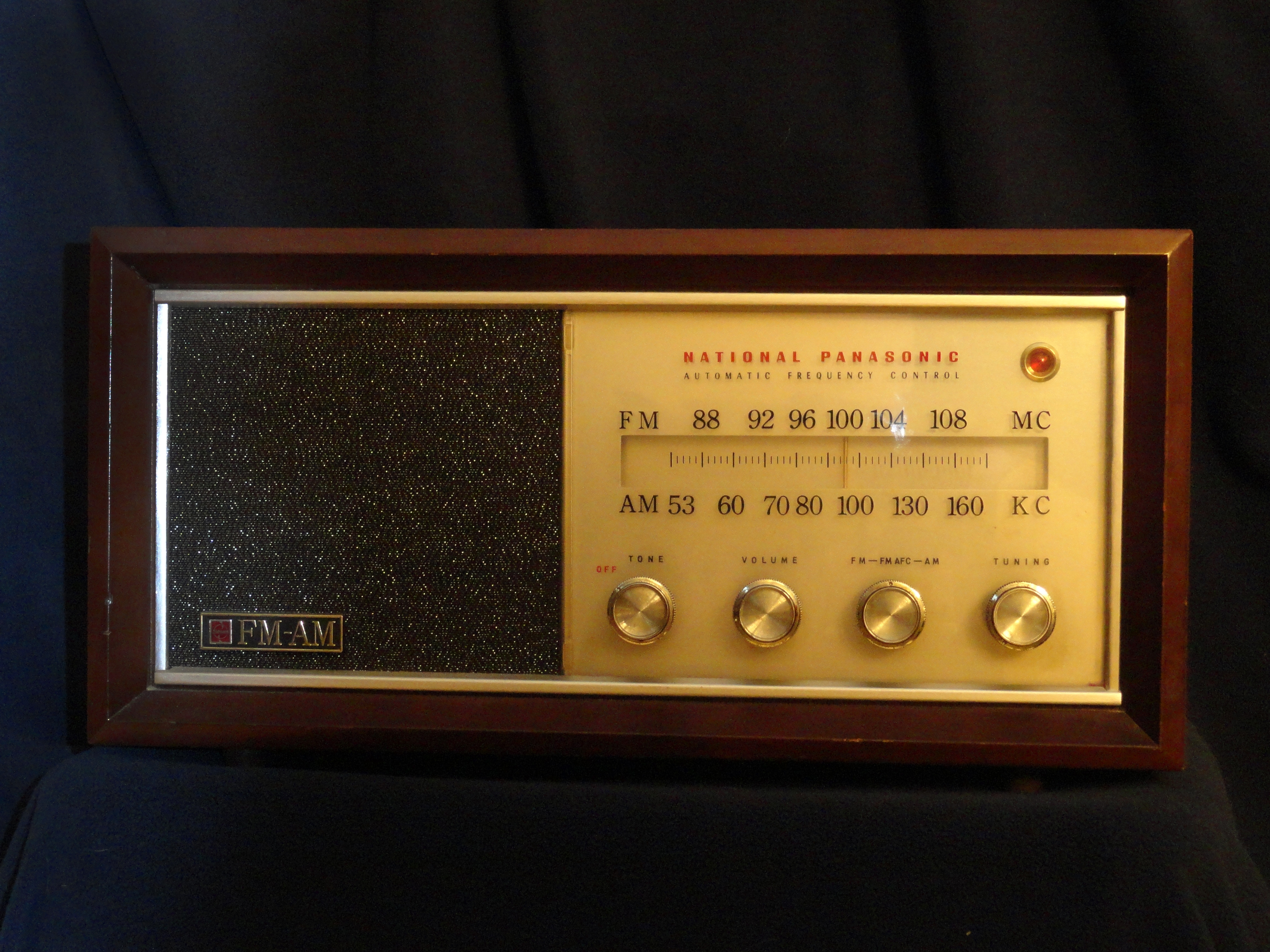
National Panasonic RE-784A in walnut veneer

The National Panasonic Model RE-784A is a vacuum tube AM/FM table radio from the post-war era (1960s) manufactured by National Panasonic (defunct, now Panasonic). The miniature tube-based circuitry follows the "All American Five" tube design, which allowed a more compact footprint of the radio; suited for sitting atop a fireplace mantle or to be mounted under a kitchen cabinet. One feature of the FM band for this radio is AFC tuning, that allowed the listener to "lock-in" an FM station without having to worry about station drifting or drops in audio volume associated with FM station tuning.

== Construction ==
The radio is rather small when compared to other tube radios available at the time, with the cabinet (not including 4 hard rubber feet) measuring approx. 17.3 × 8.7 × 6.3 inches and weighing in at just a couple pounds. Several options for the case were available, including acrylic. However, wooden cases were more common and constructed from a sturdy laminated plywood with a finished (typically walnut) veneer. The rear of the case was made from fiber pegboard material to allow proper ventilation of heat generated by the tubes inside. The tubes are user-replaceable and are easily accessible with the removal of the 3 Philips screws on the back of the unit. The AC power cable terminates to a 2-prong female plug on the rear pegboard case to discourage powering the unit while the cover is removed, as a safety feature.

== Internal circuitry ==
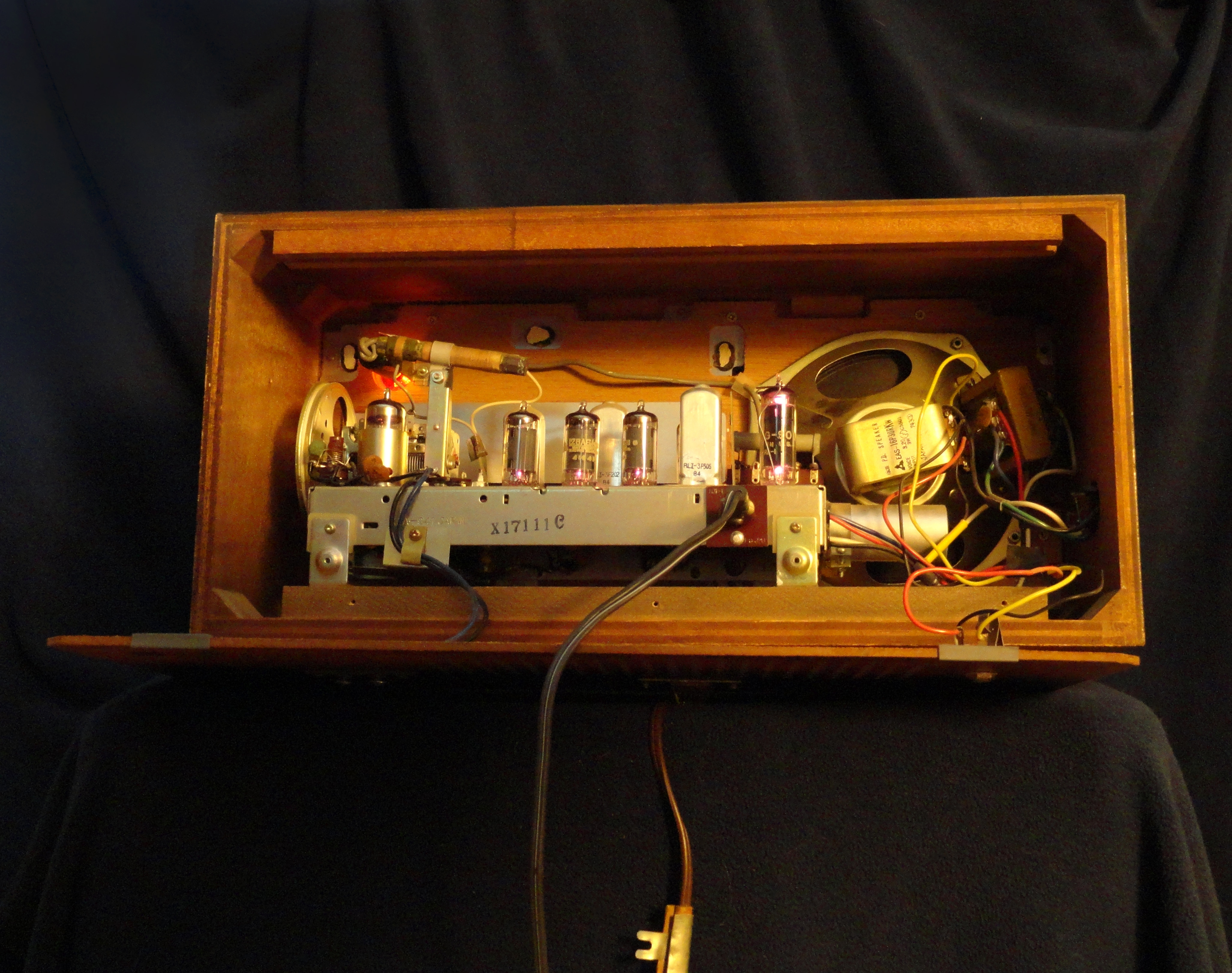
Rear panel removed to show glowing tubes

The circuitry used in the radio is based on the "All-American Five (miniature)" tube setup, sans the 35W4 mini rectifier tube that would have been used at the time in other tube radios.

=== Tubes used in the 784 series ===
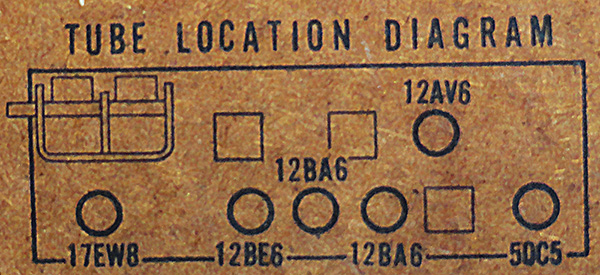
RE-784A Tube Location Diagram

The 784 series uses a total of six tubes, 5 of which are "miniature". The only "full-size" tube is the 17EW8, which is used to drive the AM/FM receiver circuit.

- 17EW8: VHF Double [Triode]
- 12BE6: Heptode Pentagrid
- 12BA6 (two) Pentode: used for RF amplification
- 12AV6: Duplex-diodes
- 50C5: Beam Pentode used for the power amplifier, which drives the speaker.

== Specifications ==
Power requirements: 110–120 volts alternating current (AC) at 60 Hz (US power plug)

AM frequency range: 525–1605 kHz

FM frequency range: 87–108 MHz

Front controls: Volume, AM/FM/FM-AFC, tuning, neon power indicator lamp. The tone knob changes the clarity of broadcasts, as well as integrates the power switch. Turning the tone knob fully counterclockwise shuts the radio off.

Internal loudspeaker: 6.50-inch paper cone (dynamic), made by Matushita, 3.2Ω, 3 Watts

== Collectibility ==
Since AM and FM radio stations still exist throughout the world, the 784-series has not become obsolete quite yet. Not many models of tube FM radios exist, due to the time frame of when this particular radio was released; around the time the transistor made its way into consumer electronics. The 784 is fairly common on the used market (found on sites, such as eBay), with prices ranging between US$25 and $200, depending on condition and cabinet construction. The plywood-constructed 784s are sturdier, due to plastic-cased variants being susceptible to cracking or discoloring.

Vacuum tube audio still finds a niche market within the audiophile community. Tube amplification is known for its warmer sound, and known to bring out the fullest of analog media, when compared to solid state audio components. The RE-784 should not be considered an "Audiophile" radio, but a low-cost gateway into the potential of the tube audio community.

== Use and care ==
All vacuum tubes are susceptible to failure after their useful life has been given up. The 784 includes a circuit diagram printed on the bottom of the unit, as well as a tube location diagram on the rear access panel. Due to the age of the 784, the inside has likely collected dust, and should be lightly blown out with compressed air to prevent a burning smell from the dust. Furthermore, the tops of the tubes should be cleaned with a minor solvent (with the unit disconnected and cooled down) to remove caked-on dust to help dissipate heat for longer life of the tubes. The tubes may become unseated from their sockets during shipping, and care should be taken to prevent them from being subjected to heavy vibrations and shock if the unit needs to be moved.

Tube amplifiers can require several minutes to warm up to achieve optimal tonal quality. Unlike transistors, vacuum tubes require sufficient heat to allow the flow of electrons between plates inside of the vacuum

Power on procedure: Turn volume knob all the way down. Turn the tone knob clockwise for an affirmative "click" and wait approximately 45 seconds for the tubes to heat up. You can then adjust the volume and tone accordingly.

Tuning an FM station: With the unit powered on, turn the AM/FM knob to FM. Slowly turn the dial to the desired station in the loudest position. The AM/FM knob can then be turned to FM AFC to prevent tuning drift.

=== Troubleshooting ===
Any of the six tubes located within the radio will start to show signs of age after several hundreds of hours from normal operation. The simplest method to verify a tube is working is peer into the back of the unit with power applied. If you notice any tubes not glowing orange, there is likely a failed tube or circuit driving the tube. Alternately, some tubes may start showing a purple Plasma (physics) when warming up, which means the tube is likely starting to fail. The most comprehensive way to check the health of the tubes is with a tube tester, which requires removal of the tube and dialing in the specifications and reading results on a meter.

== See also ==
- History of radio
- FM broadcasting
- List of radios – List of specific models of radios
