= Panapet =

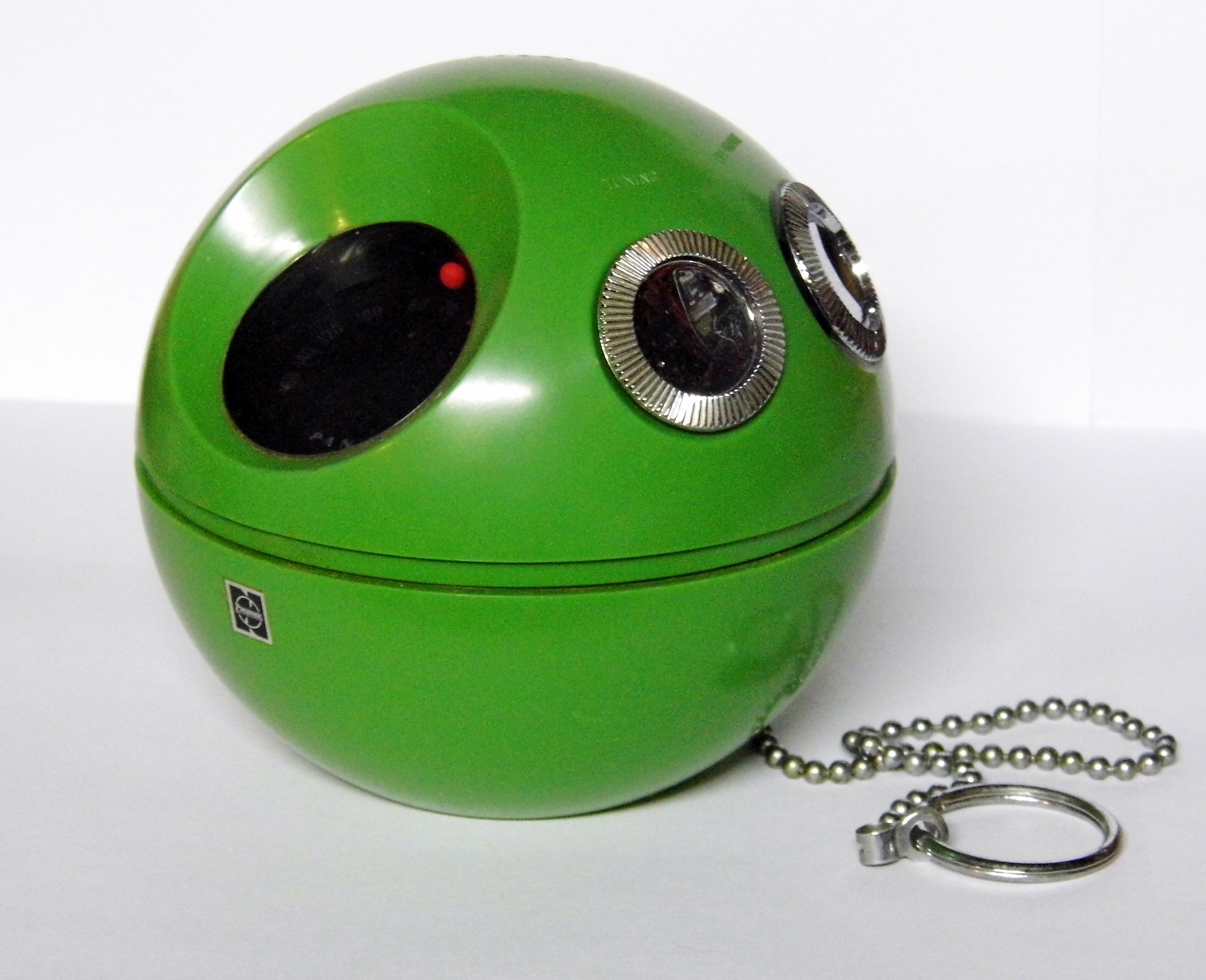
A picture of The Panapet radio

The Panapet radio is a round novelty radio on a chain, first produced by Panasonic in the early 1970s to commemorate the World Expo in Osaka Two chrome plated dials on the surface are for tuning and volume, and a tuning display is inset on the surface of the ball. The Panapet is AM band only - no FM. There is a jack for a mono earplug. The Panapet came in several colors including red, yellow, white, blue, purple and avocado green. The radio was sold in Australia in 1971 branded with the National Panasonic name and called "The Thunder-ball" in red, white and blue.

== Soviet Clones ==
A Soviet clone of this radio is called Saratov, named after the city where it was manufactured. While being similar externally, it is fully different internally. It is a nine-transistor TRF receiver with transformerless audio amplifier, while the prototype is a six-transistor superheterodyne, and its audio amplifier uses transformers. The clone has no chain, but has metal ring between ball halves instead. A later clone, LW superheterodyne with transformerless audio amplifier by the same manufacturer is called Batiskaf (meaning "bathyscaphe"), it has chain and dial and lacks metal ring between halves, like in original Panapet. Another later clone, similar to previous one, but without chain, was manufactured in Khmelnitsky, it has the 1980 Moscow Summer Olympics logo on its dial.

== See also ==
- List of radios – List of specific models of radios
