= Panasonic Toot-a-Loop Radio =

Novelty radio made by Panasonic Japan in the early 1970s

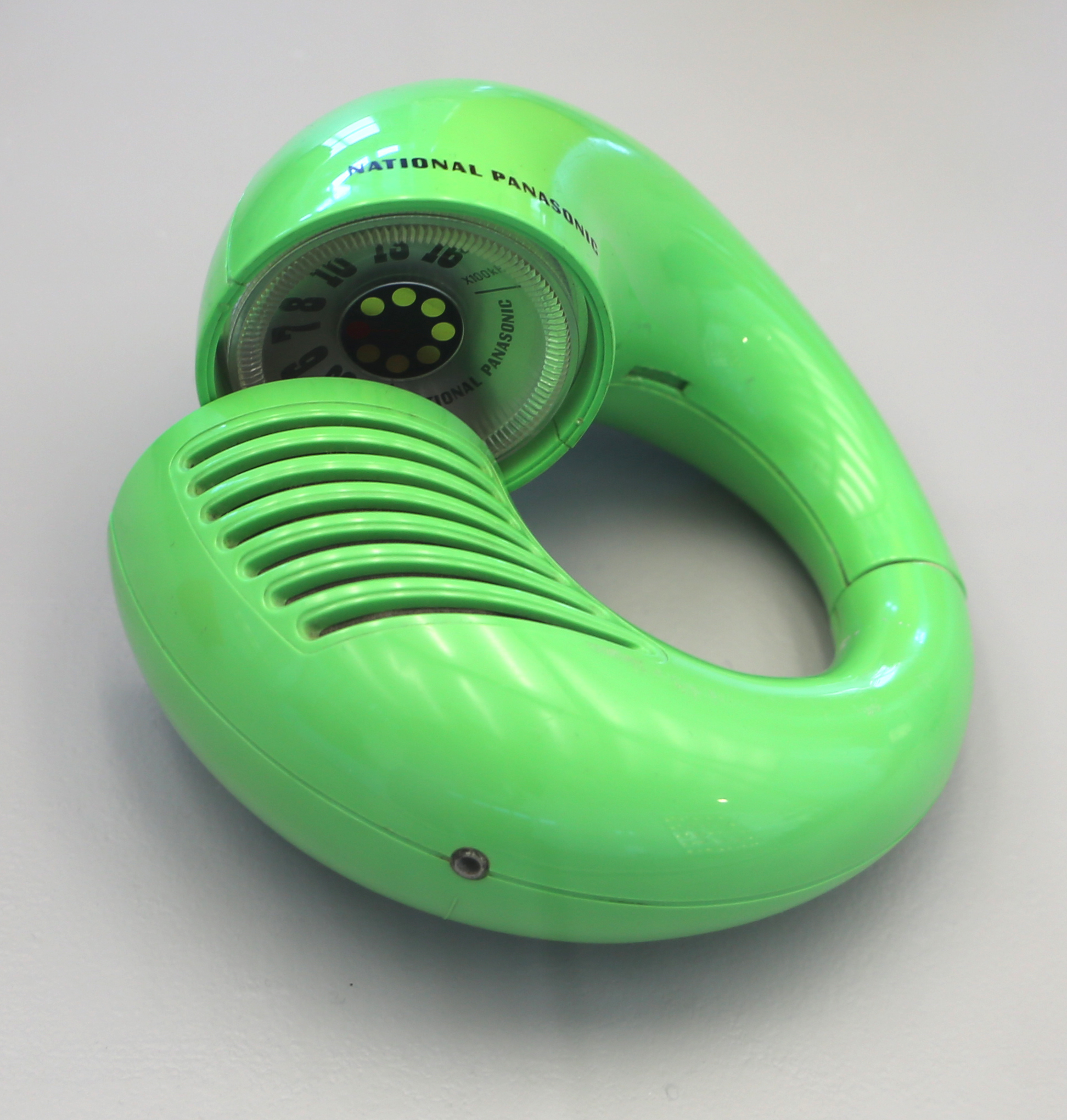
A picture of The Toot-a-Loop Radio or Panasonic R-72

The Toot-a-Loop Radio or Panasonic R-72 was a novelty radio made by Panasonic Japan in the early 1970s. This radio was designed to be wrapped around the wrist. It also came with stickers for customizing the unit. Reception was the AM broadcast band only - no FM (the FM version of this radio is called RF-72). The radio was shaped something like a donut with the hole off-center. When twisted, the two halves pivot and would separate, forming an "S" shape. One side of the radio had a grille behind which sat the speaker. There was also a jack for a mono earplug. The tuner was located inside one of the "splits," so the radio had to be twisted into the "S" position in order to be tuned, but the volume control was on the outer diameter of the radio and could be adjusted regardless of whether the radio was twisted open or closed. The Toot-a-Loop came in several colors including white, red, blue, and yellow. It was also produced in orange and lime, which were sold in Australia and New Zealand. Australian and New Zealand models had the badging National Panasonic and were advertised as a "Sing-O-Ring" radio. Also known by collectors as a bangle or wrist radio. The advertisement song went "It's an S it's an O it's a crazy radio! Toot a loop!".

== See also ==
- List of radios – List of specific models of radios
