= Motorola Saber =

Portable radio by Motorola

The Motorola Saber portable radio is a product series of Motorola USA, Inc. The Saber is a commercial radio that was developed for the U.S. military sometime around 1989. The Saber is widely recognizable by thin, sleek design compared to other radios at the time. Despite the fact that the Saber was originally marketed to the military, many law enforcement agencies and fire departments realized the benefits of the Saber and Motorola soon had a much larger customer base for the radio than they expected.

== Saber Conventional ==
The first Saber line was conventional operation only. The conventional Sabers were capable of PL/DPL and were encryption capable. The Saber came in 4 different flavors; I, II, III, and IE. The Model I has 12 channels in 1 zone, and no display or keypad. The IE was a Model I with an additional zone of 12 channels, 24 in all. The Model II is either capable of 4 or 10 zones, for a total of 48 or 120 channels. This is dependent on the memory. It has a backlight display which was capable of 5 alphanumeric characters if you have the 120 channel 2 KB version or the basic zone/channel display for the 48 channel version. It came with 3 soft keys to access menu options. The Model III was basically a Model II with a full DTMF keypad.

== Systems Saber ==
The Systems Saber added analog trunking operation, direct access to functions via the keypad (on the Systems Saber III), and increased channel capacity to a then-unheard of 255 conventional channels. The Systems Saber also increased the number of channels per zone to sixteen and added the ability to reprogram the function of many of the controls.

== ASTRO™ Digital Saber ==
The Astro Saber was introduced in the mid 1990s and was technologically advanced and state of the art at the time, not only is it capable of IMBE Digital and conventional analog on a per channel basis, but also some models are 12.5/25 kHz per channel as well. This makes some Astro Saber Narrow Band compliant.

Model I has 16 channels, in 1 zone. No display or keypad. Model II has 16 channels in 16 zones and a 14 character alphanumeric backlight display. It came with 6 soft key buttons to access an advanced menu. Model III was basically a model II with a full DTMF keypad.

== See also ==
- List of radios – List of specific models of radios
