= ZO-47 =

The ZO-47 is a compact, modular, valve-based clandestine radio set developed by Philips in 1947. It was custom-built for O&I (Operatiën en Inlichtingen), the post-WW2 Dutch Stay-behind organisation. Standing for Zendontvanger 1947 (Transmitter/Receiver 1947), it represents one of the very few clandestine radio stations designed and produced by Philips.

By the mid-1950s, the Dutch stay-behind network began transitioning to standardized American, British, and West German espionage kit such as the RS-1 and RS-6.

== See also ==
- Amateur radio homebrew
- List of amateur radio transceivers
- QRP operation
- Vintage amateur radio
