= Superette (radio) =

In 1931 RCA introduced a new line of Superette radio receivers. These used the superheterodyne principle but were lower cost than earlier products, in an attempt to maintain sales during the onset of the Great Depression.

RCA Superette Console R-9 (Bottom) and RCA Superette Table Radio R-7 (Above)

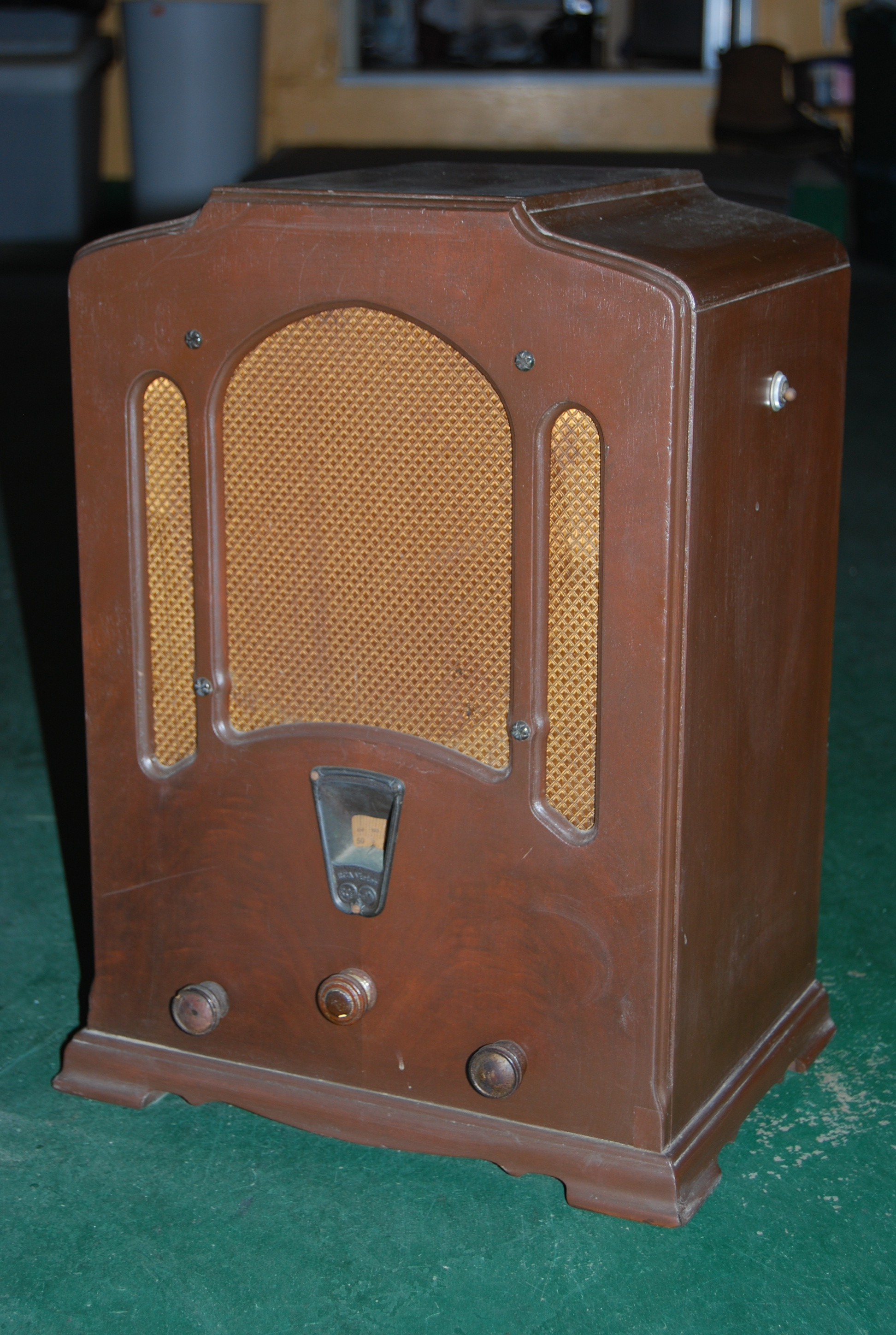
1931 RCA Superette R-7 Table Radio- the most common version

== Background ==
Edwin Howard Armstrong invented the superheterodyne receiver in 1918. Armstrong and RCA (under David Sarnoff) had a business and technical relationship, that would last into the 1940s.

Funded by RCA, Armstrong designed a radio that can receive stations easily without complex tuning or interference from other stations. Early radio designs by Armstrong and others produced radios that were very sensitive but hard to keep under control due to the nature of radio waves operating at higher frequencies. Armstrong's superheterodyne receiver converted these high frequencies into one lower frequency. This allow the radio to be more stable or easier to tune, with less interference.

The result was the RCA Radiola AR-812 and Radiola VIII Superheterodynes in 1924, the world's first consumer superheterodyne receivers. In 1924, these cost $224 and $475 respectively. Up to 1930, RCA controlled the superheterodyne patent, and any radio manufacturer that wanted to build one had to pay royalties to RCA. In 1928 RCA launched their first AC operated superheterodyne radio, the Radiola 60 ($147 in 1928 dollars).

All these superhets were large and expensive. In the 1930s the depression was in full force. The trend in radios were smaller, more compact and lower cost. RCA introduced the Superette line in 1931 with the R7 table and R9 console.

== Models ==
From 1931 RCA produced a range of small mantel radios called the Superette, which at introduction sold for $57.50 not including the vacuum tubes. "Super" was derived from superheterodyne. Probably the most well known is the Model R-7, which was produced in several versions.

RCA also produced a console version, the model R-9. The R-7 and R-9 share identical chassis (using RCA tubes 280, 227, 235, 245 and 224). There were several versions of the R7 table (mantel) version: the R-7A using pentode output tubes (RCA 247), R-7DC and R-9DC for 110 VDC power, and the R-7 LW for long wave listening. These early superheterodynes had no AVC so stronger stations were louder than weaker ones.

== Spinoffs ==
RCA produced spinoffs of the Superette during the 1931-32 model year. These models are based on the R-7 design but are not called Superette in RCA's literature. "Superette" was reserved for the R-7 and R-9 models.

1. R-4 TABLE version- Similar to R-7A
2. R-6 CONSOLE version of R4- Similar to R-7A
3. R-8 and R-8DC TABLE version- Similar to R-7A (has Automatic Volume Control or AVC)
4. R-10 Console- Similar to R-7 and R-9 circuit design
5. R-10DC Console- Similar to R-9DC
6. R-12 Console version of R-8- to R-7A (has Automatic Volume Control or AVC)
7. RE-16A Phonograph-Radio Combination Console- Similar to R-7A
