= Army No. 108 Wireless Set =

Wireless radio transceiver

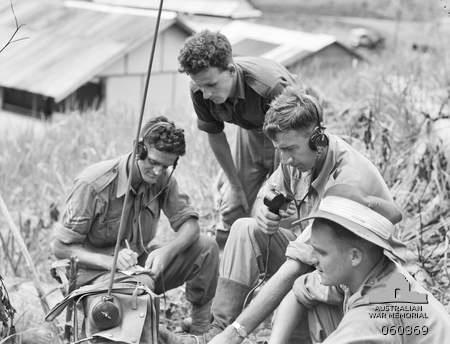
Students of the School of Signals, New Guinea Force, working with a 108 Army Wireless Set

The No. 108 Wireless Set was a wireless radio transceiver used by the Australian Army during the World War II. The unit was based on the Wireless Set No. 18 and was modified during its production forming 3 different variants: Mk1, Mk2 and Mk3.

== See also ==
- Army No. 208 Wireless Set
