= A-7 (transceiver) =

Portable military VHF radio transceiver

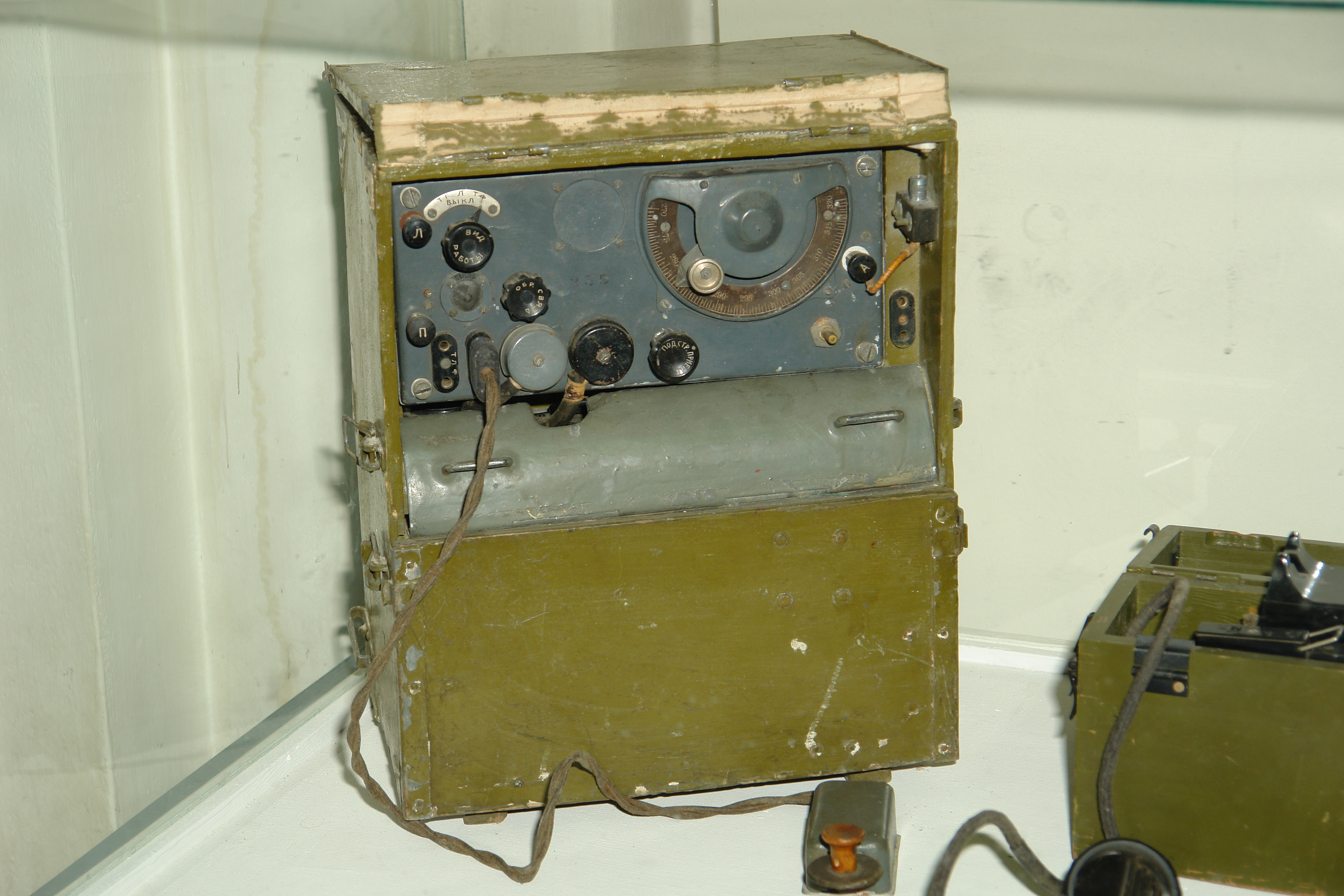
A-7 VHF transceiver

The Soviet A-7 VHF radio transceiver (later models include the A-7a and A-7b) was developed during World War II and used for communication in rifle brigades and regiments. The complete station was designed to be transported by an individual soldier.

== Design and features ==
=== A-7 ===
The A-7 is a portable man-pack, radio transceiver with narrow-band frequency modulation. The set can be used as a radio telephone in a wired network and managed remotely. Setting the frequency of the receiver and transmitter circuits is adjusted in tandem by one control handle. The antenna and buffer oscillator circuits are common for the receiving and transmitting circuits.

The receiver section is a superheterodyne design with a single frequency conversion, consisting of 8 identical 2K2M valves. A regenerative detector with adjustable feedback is used. The transmitter section includes a 2K2M modulator valve, a CO-257 buffer amplifier valve, and a CO-257 power amplifier valve. Switching from reception to transmission is achieved by switching the power from the heater circuits of the receiver and transmitter valves, alternately.

The transceiver with power supplies and accessories is housed in a wooden box with shoulder straps for carrying as a backpack. For long distances, the set is carried by two soldiers. The set only requires one radio operator. The deployment time is typically not more than five minutes.

- Frequency range: 27-32 MHz.
- Number of frequency channels: 101.
- Transmitter output power: 1W.
- Sensitivity of the receiver: 1-1.5 μV.
- Intermediate frequency: 1100 kHz.
- Antennas: a whip with a height of 2.5 m or a flexible wire 6.4 m long.
- Range of action:
  - On rough terrain - up to 7–8 km.
  - On urban conditions - 3–4 km.
  - On slightly cross-country terrain outside of buildings - 10 km and more.
- Power source: two dry anode batteries BAS-80 with a total voltage of 160 V and two 2 NKN-10 nickel-cadmium batteries. The time of continuous operation from one set is 35–40 hours.
- Dimensions of the transceiver (without protruding parts): 285 × 135 × 165 mm.
- Dimensions of the packing box: 210 × 385 × 330 mm.
- Mass of the radio station: 15.5 kg, the battery weighs 6 kg.

=== A-7a ===
A-7a is a simplified version of the A-7. The total number of valves was reduced to 9. In the transmitter section, the functions of the modulator and power amplifier were combined into one valve, and in the receiver section one valve was used to simultaneously perform the functions of a high-frequency and low-frequency amplifier (the so-called reflex circuit). The ability to work by telegraph was removed. Energy consumption was decreased by about 30%, other main characteristics were not changed. The A-7a set was manufactured by various factories in several different variants: with and without a tone button, with one or two measuring instruments, etc.

=== A-7b ===
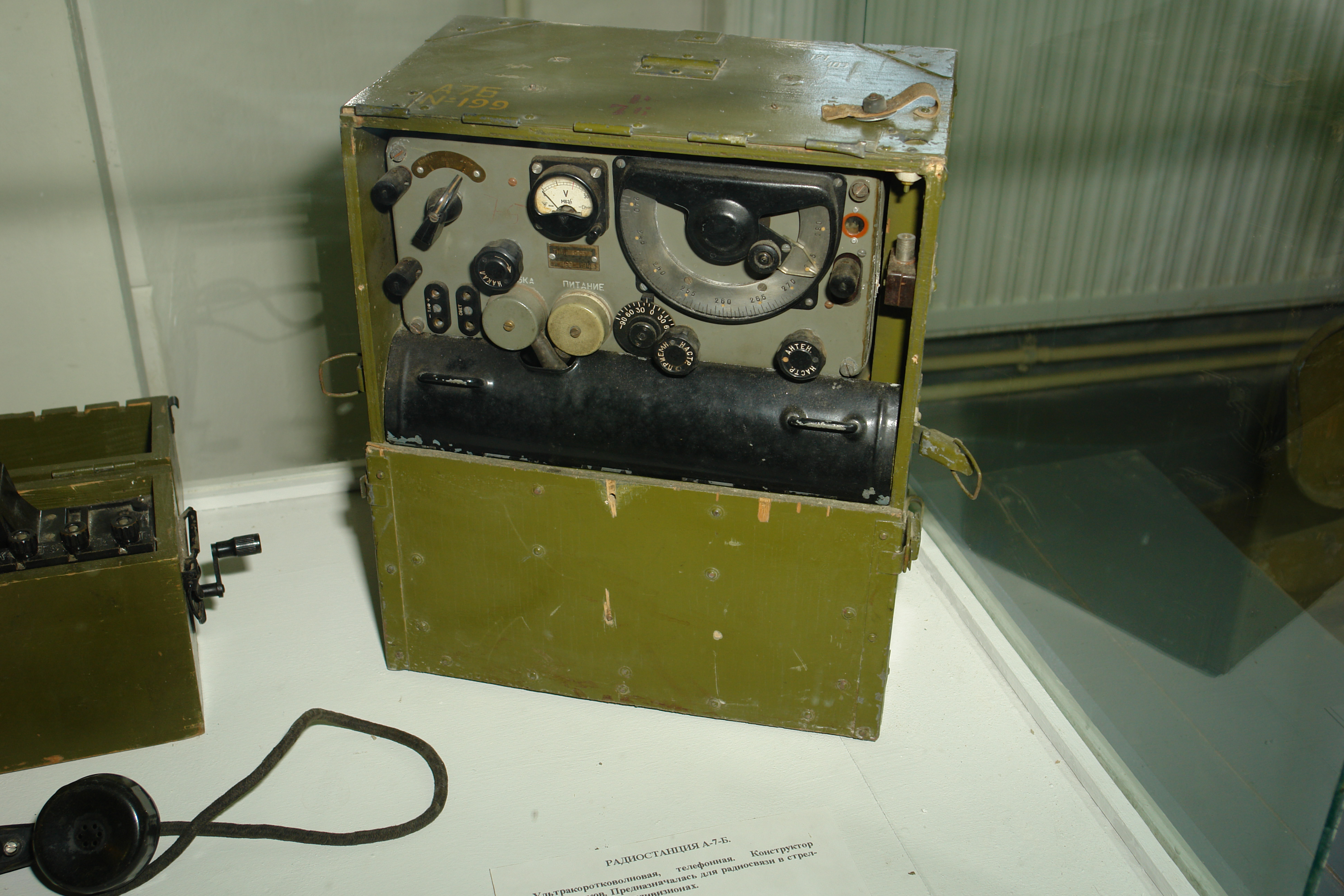
A-7b

A-7b is a ten-valve version introduced in 1945. In the transmitter section two output valves are used in parallel. The transmitting range was increased by around 50%. The frequency range is 24-28 MHz. There is no feedback adjustment in the detector circuit.

The A-7b was also manufactured from 1950 to 1956 in Pardubice, Czechoslovakia by the Tesla company.
