= SRF-39 =

Portable radio model

The SRF-39 is a portable AM/FM radio introduced in approximately 1992 by Sony. It uses a single AA battery, as its analog electronics require very little voltage. It was one of the first radios to use the CXA1129 30-pin integrated circuit, which later was responsible for the SRF-39's sensitive and selective performance.

A variant of the SRF-39, the SRF-39FP, has a transparent case, designed to thwart contraband concealment. The radio often appears on the commissary lists of U.S. federal prisons, hence the "FP" suffix.

The SRF-39 was followed by the SRF-49 in 1997, the PSY-03 in 1999, and the SRF-59 in 2001. These radios are popular in the DXing community due to their sensitivity, selectivity and ferrite antennas.

== See also ==
- History of radio
