= Shortwave radio receiver =

Shortwave radio

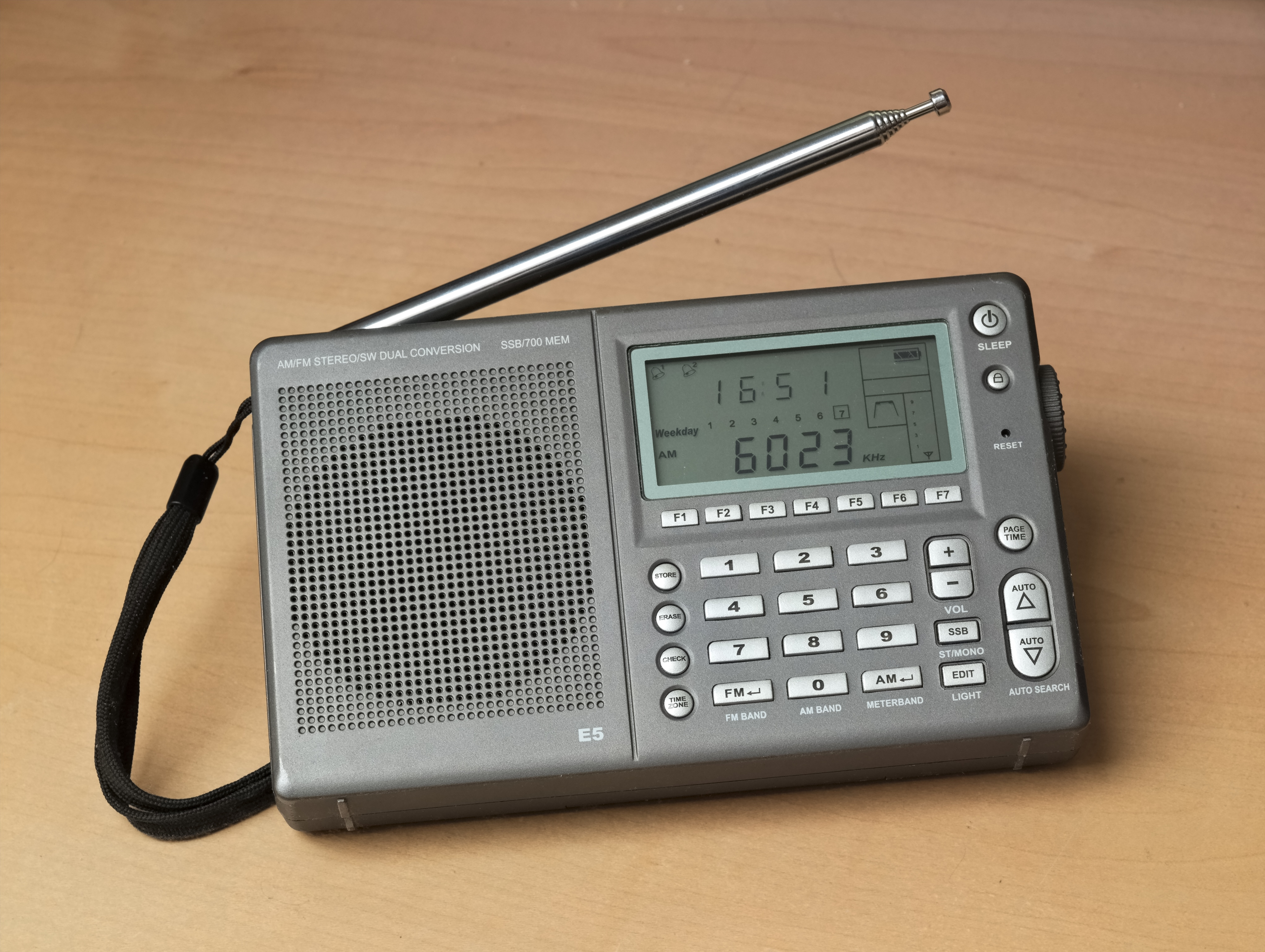
Modern portable shortwave radio receiver with digital frequency display and keypad for direct frequency entry.

A shortwave radio receiver is a radio receiver that can receive one or more shortwave bands, between 1.6 and 30 MHz. A shortwave radio receiver often receives other broadcast bands, such as FM radio, Longwave and Mediumwave. Shortwave radio receivers are often used by dedicated hobbyists called shortwave listeners.

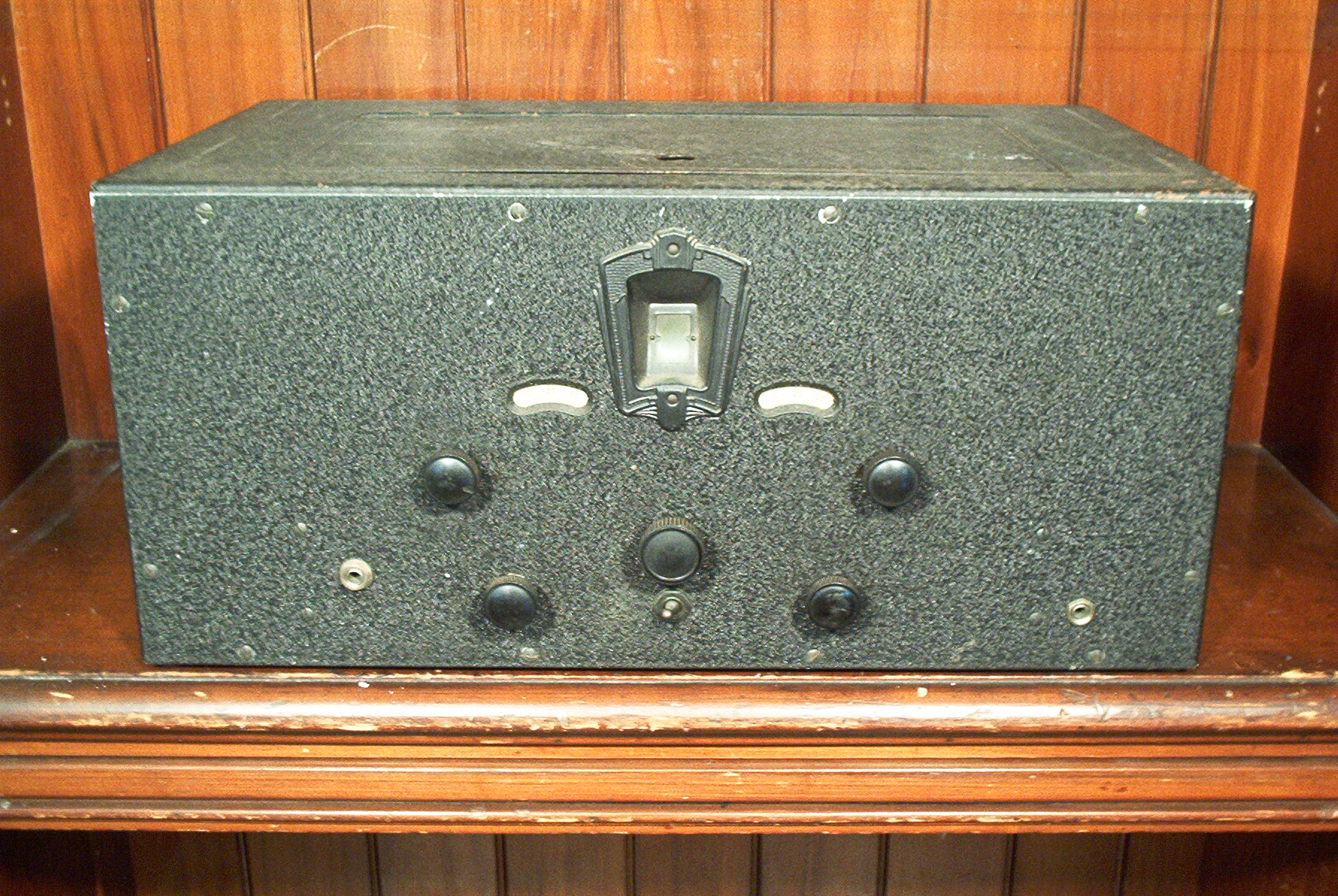
Hammarlund Comet Pro shortwave receiver, circa 1931.

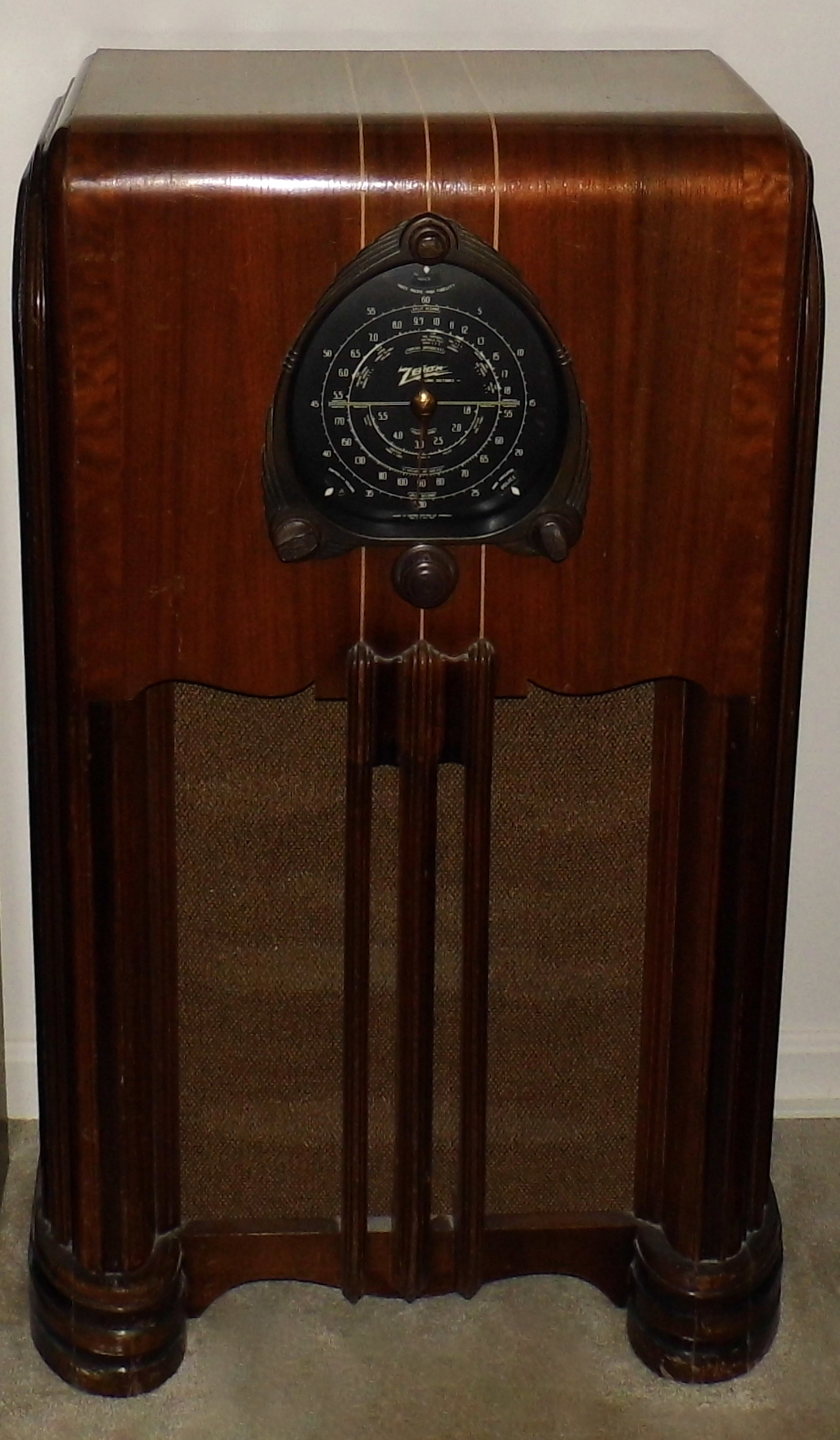
Zenith console radio receiver with shortwave bands, circa 1938.

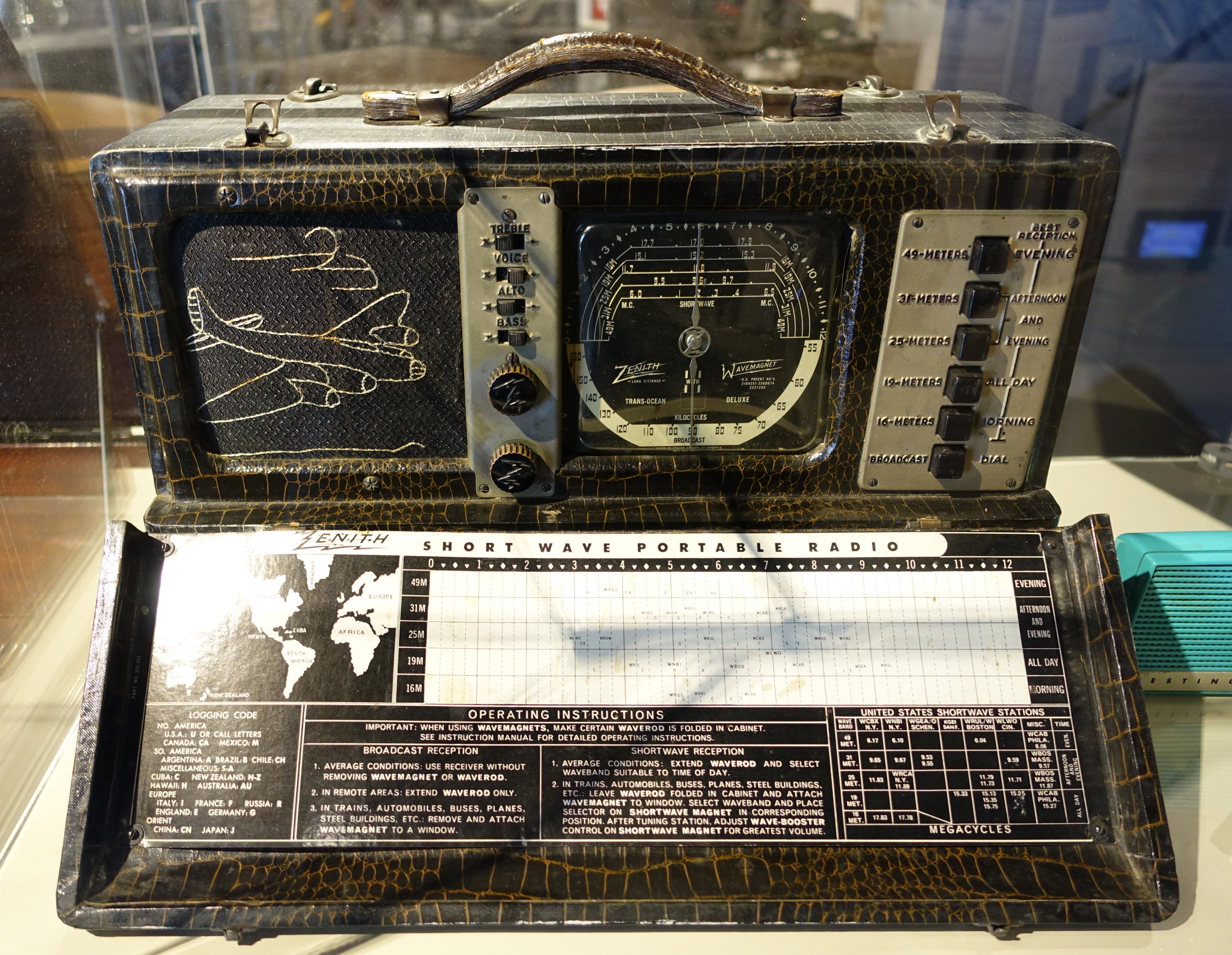
One of the first portable shortwave radio receivers: Zenith Model 7G605 Trans-Oceanic 'Clipper' circa 1942.

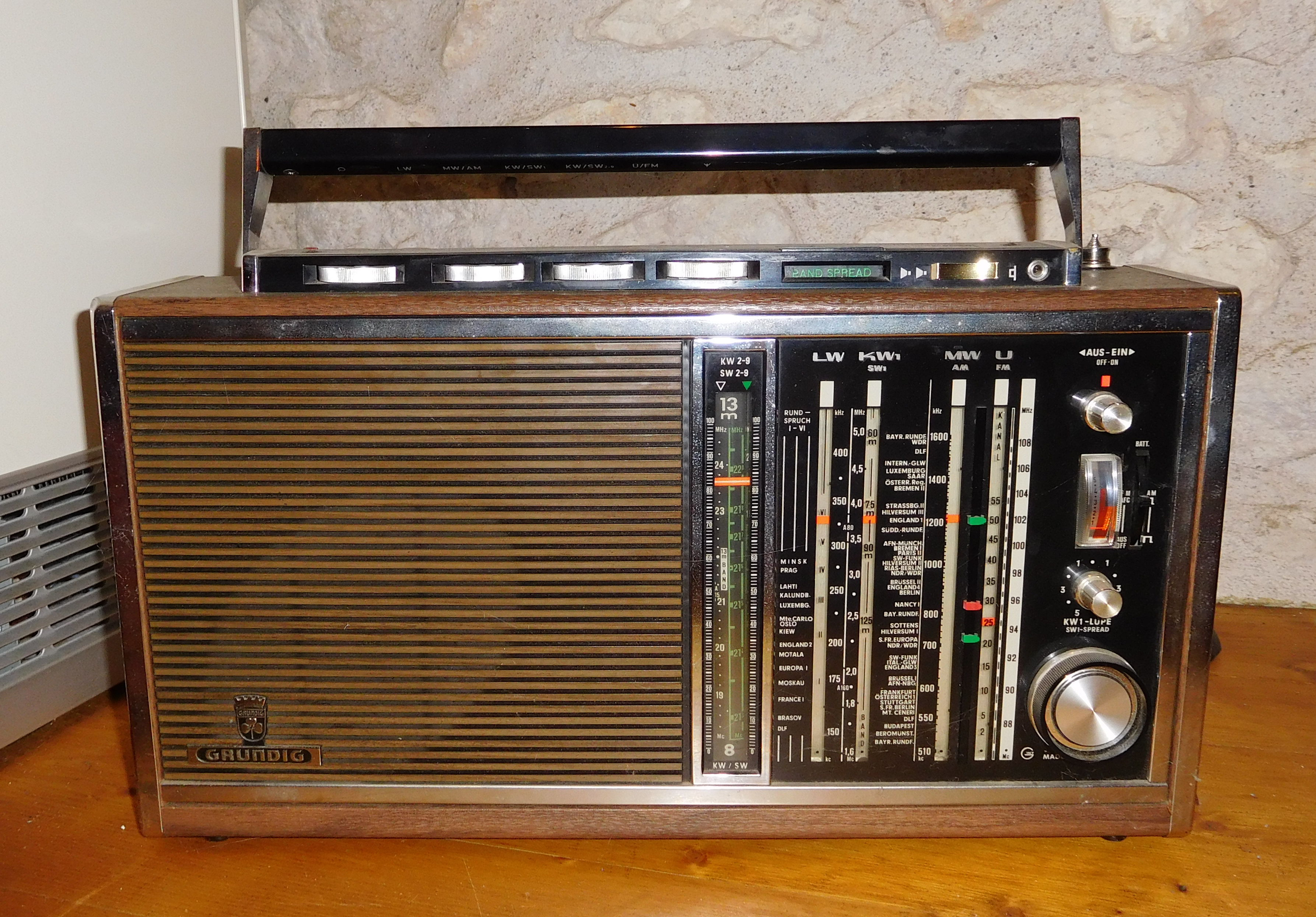
Grundig Satellit 210 portable receiver, circa 1969–1971 featuring early solid state circuitry.

== History ==
While home built shortwave receivers had been used by amateur radio operators and radio experimenters prior to World War I, the first time shortwave radio reception was available to the general public was through the use of shortwave frequency converters sold as accessories to broadcast-band radio sets during the mid 1920s. Such converters were generally found unsatisfactory in performance, and so dedicated shortwave receiving sets soon appeared on the market. National Radio Company introduced the SW-2 "Thrill box" shortwave regenerative receiver in 1927, and later offered improved models, such as the highly regarded SW-3. Other notable early shortwave receivers included Pilot Radio's "Super Wasp" line of regenerative receivers.

E.H. Scott Radio Laboratories offered its superheterodyne "World's Record" shortwave receiver kit in the late 1920s, and In 1931 Hammarlund introduced the "Comet Pro", the first fully assembled commercial shortwave superheterodyne receiver. Hallicrafters introduced the "Super Skyrider" in 1935, a superheterodyne shortwave receiver available in several different models that covered the broadcast band up to 30 MHz. In 1936, Hammarlund introduced their "Super-Pro" superheterodyne shortwave receiver.

Superheterodyne receiver circuits soon essentially replaced all previous receiver designs, and radio manufacturers such as RCA, Zenith, Philco, Emerson, and Stromberg-Carlson offered consumers table or console model "all wave" sets that could receive both mediumwave and shortwave bands. By 1936 it was estimated that 100 percent of console models and 65 percent of table model radios were able to receive shortwave broadcasts.

Following development of several prototypes between 1939 and 1941, Zenith introduced the Model 7G605 Trans-Oceanic 'Clipper' in 1942, an early portable shortwave receiver marketed to consumers. Shortwave receiver designs had traditionally employed vacuum tubes, but solid state circuit designs began to emerge in the 1950s. The Magnavox model AW-100 was introduced in 1957 and was among the first commercial fully transistorized shortwave radio receivers, along with the Trans-Oceanic Royal 1000 (1957) and Trans-World Portable T-9 Code 126 (1958).

As shortwave receivers evolved, they gained a number of improvements over their early counterparts. Direct digital tuning eliminated the guesswork and imprecision inherent in analog tuners. Solid state components minimized frequency drift. Synchronous detection improved audio fidelity and stability. And miniaturization of components along with integrated circuits enabled the manufacture of small, portable shortwave receivers with adequate sensitivity to deliver satisfactory shortwave reception.

== Receiver types and features ==
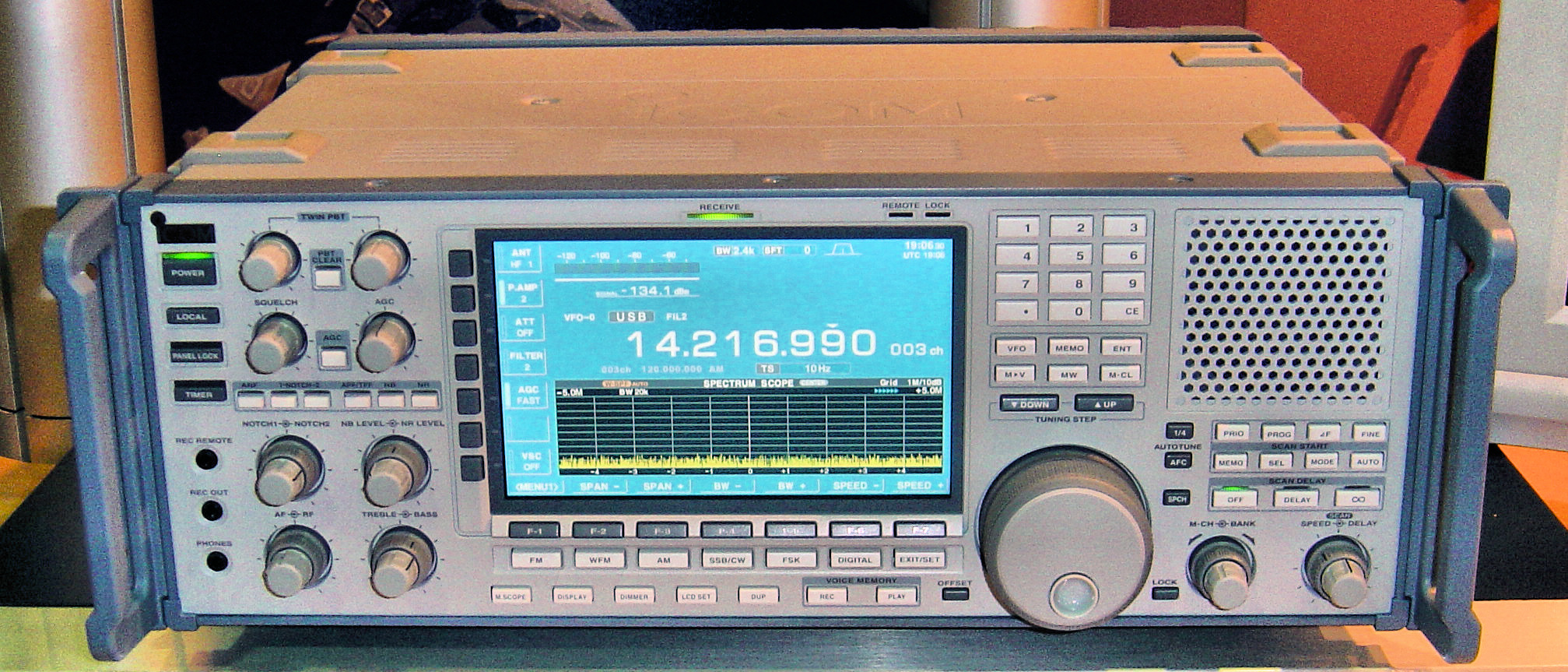
Modern Icom RC-9500 shortwave communications receiver

Modern battery-operated portable shortwave radio receivers often called world radio or world band receivers are marketed primarily to those wishing to receive international broadcasts, and are offered in a range of compact "travel size" to smaller "pocket size" units.

Shortwave receivers known as communications receivers are typically larger table top sets used in amateur radio, commercial, and military installations, and by serious hobbyists. They typically include features that enable increased sensitivity and selectivity.

Radios for shortwave reception generally have higher performance than those intended for the local mediumwave, longwave or FM broadcast band, since dependable reception of shortwave signals requires a radio with increased sensitivity, selectivity, dynamic range and frequency stability. Modern shortwave radio receivers are relatively inexpensive and easily accessible, and many hobbyists use portable "world band" receivers and built-in telescopic antennas. Serious hobbyists may use communications receivers and outdoor antenna located away from electrical noise sources, such as a dipole made from wire and insulators.

The typical shortwave radio receiver design is a superheterodyne receiver. Software-defined radios replace one or more stages of a superheterodyne receiver with digital signal processing for filtering, demodulation or other processing.

=== Basic receiver functions ===
A well equipped shortwave radio receiver can receive CW and SSB modes in addition to the AM mode traditionally used by broadcasters. Some modern shortwave radio receivers can receive digital radio signals.

Some receivers only tune within frequency bands allocated by international agreement. This may be necessary in some countries where restrictive laws prevent persons from listening to non-broadcast stations. Others offer continuous tuning over the whole shortwave frequency range, allowing the user to listen to amateur radio, marine, air, and utility stations as well as broadcasters.

Tuners on analog receivers may include a bandspread control to allow accurate tuning of closely spaced frequencies. Receivers with digital tuning usually allow direct entry of frequencies with sufficient accuracy and precision so as not to require additional fine-tuning adjustment.

==== Typical features ====
A number of specialized features are typically found in shortwave receivers.

- RF gain control - this might include RF attenuators.
- Reception of some or all of the shortwave bands from 1.6 MHz to 30 MHz.
- One or more front end RF filters.
- Supported demodulation types:
  - Amplitude modulation (AM)
  - Digital Radio Mondiale (DRM)
  - Single-sideband modulation (SSB, LSB, USB) - (uses a BFO and a product detector. The BFO might be tunable)
  - Morse code continuous wave (CW) - (uses a BFO and a product detector. The BFO might be tunable)
  - Frequency modulation (FM)
- Audio limiters
- Noise blanker
- Signal strength meter.
- AVC/AGC adjustments.
- Antenna diversity - e.g. supported by Telefunken E127 with Antennen-Diversity-Gerät - and some versions of HPSDR.
- Antenna tuner.
- Passband bandwidth - might have more than one selectable bandwidth.
- Frequency display dials - analog or digital.

Additional for superheterodyne receivers:

- Single, double, triple or quad conversion.
- IF filter types.
- Image response rejection ratio

Additional for software-defined radio / digital baseband receivers:

- Waterfall display support or not.
- Both In-phase and Quadrature signals:
  - I-Q signal-bandwidth.
  - Number of A/D converter bits (determines the maximum achievable dynamic range within the I-Q signal-bandwidth; 10 bits approximately equals 60 dB)

=== Software-defined radio ===
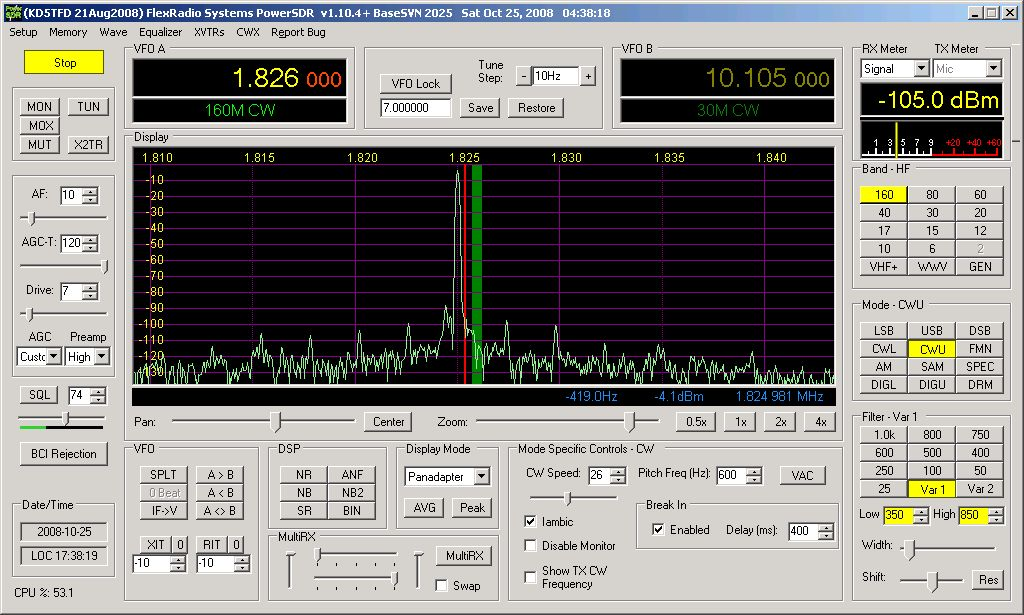
PC spectrum display of a modern software-defined shortwave receiver

A feature coming into wide use in modern shortwave receivers is DSP technology, short for digital signal processing. DSP is the use of digital means to process signals, and a primary benefit in shortwave receivers is the ability to tailor the bandwidth of the receiver to current reception conditions and to the type of signal being listened to. A typical analogue-only receiver may have a limited number of fixed bandwidths, or only one, but a DSP receiver may have 40 or more individually selectable filters.

Another important trend in modern shortwave listening is the use of "PC radios", or radios that are designed to be controlled by a standard personal computer. These radios as the name suggests are controlled by specialized PC software using a (serial) port connected to the radio. A PC radio may not have a front-panel at all, and may be designed exclusively for computer control, which reduces cost. In pure software-defined radios, all filtering, modulation and signal manipulation is done in software, usually by a PC soundcard or by a dedicated piece of DSP hardware.

=== "Boatanchors" ===
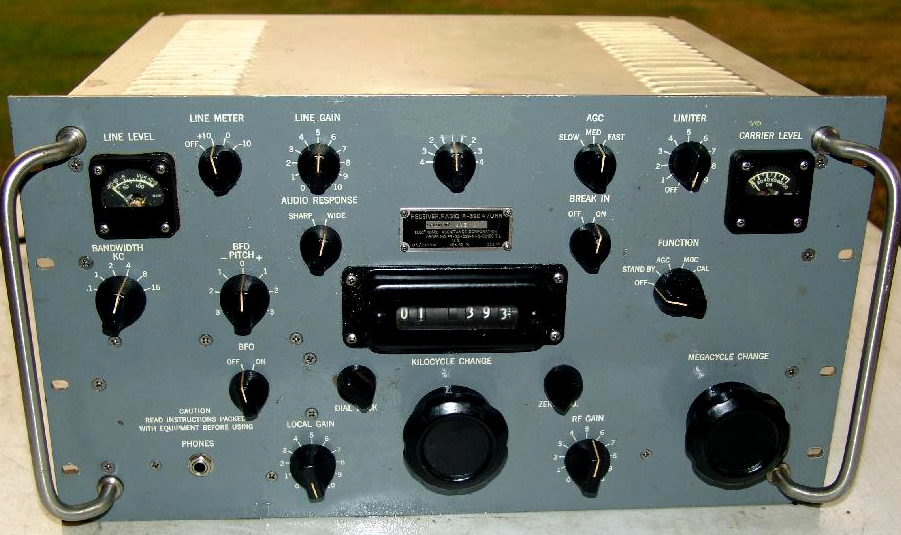
Collins R-390A shortwave communications receiver

Older vacuum tube-based communications receivers are affectionately known as boatanchors for their large size and weight. Such receivers include the Collins R-390 and R-390A, the RCA AR-88, the Racal RA-17L and the Marconi Elettra. However, even modern solid-state receivers can be very large and heavy, such as the Plessey PR2250, the Redifon R551 or the Rohde & Schwarz EK070.

== See also ==
- DXing
- List of shortwave radio broadcasters
- List of communications receivers
- Shortwave broadband antenna
