= Hallicrafters SX-28 =

American shortwave radio receiver

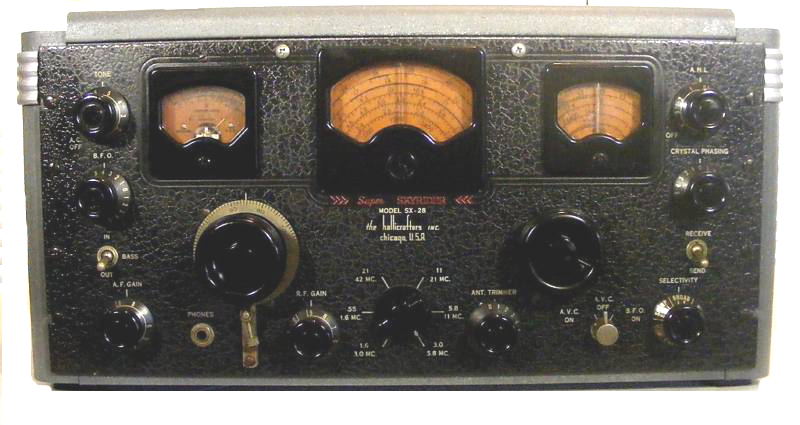
SX-28 Super Skyrider receiver

The Hallicrafters SX-28 "Super Skyrider" is an American shortwave communications receiver that was produced between 1940 and 1946 that saw wide use by amateur radio, government and military services.

== History ==
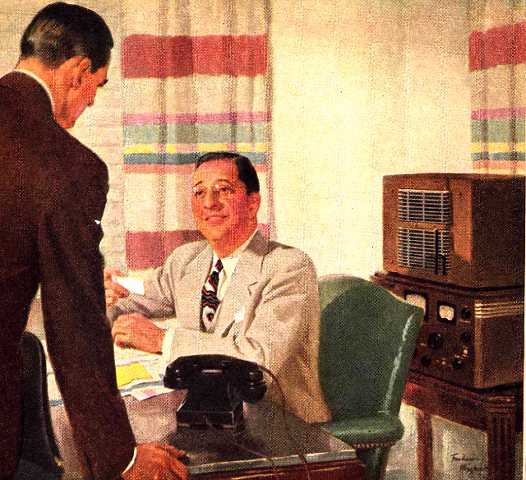
Hallicrafters founder Bill Halligan and his personal SX-28 depicted in a 1944 magazine ad

In July 1940, the Hallicrafters Company announced the SX-28 "Super Skyrider", the result of a development effort by 12 staff engineers and analysis of more than 600 reports that included input from U.S. government engineers, commercial users, and amateur radio operators. The SX-28's distinctive art deco styling was considered sleek and strikingly modern in 1940. The radio frequency coverage was 550 kHz (0.55 MHz) to 43 MHz in six bands. The SX-28 included an Amplified AVC, a Lamb Noise Silencer, Calibrated bandspread, and Push-Pull audio output. The SX-28 was known for its high fidelity audio together with high sensitivity, stability and selectivity, and good purchase value.

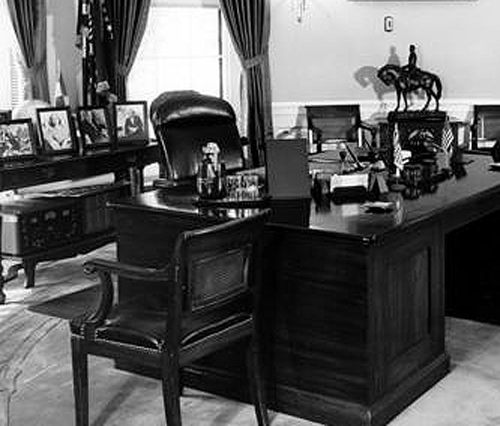
U.S. President Harry S. Truman kept an SX-28 behind his desk in the Oval Office

The SX-28 saw use by various branches of U.S. and allied military and intelligence agencies during World War II. SX-28 and Hallicrafters S-27 and S-36 receivers were often rack mounted in British government listening posts and secret listening stations for monitoring German radar and communications during the war such as Beaumanor Hall in the English Midlands where German and Italian encrypted radio messages were sent to Bletchley Park for decoding. A number of the receivers were sent to the Soviet Union as a part of the Lend Lease Act, subsequently modified to accommodate Russian tubes.

Hallicrafters published that 50,000 SX-28 and SX-28As had been built by the end of its production run in 1946, however the serial numbers appear to indicate a production figure of half, approximately 27,500 receivers. Many of the SX-28/28As that exist today are in the hands of vintage amateur radio collectors and amateur radio operators.

== The "Skyrider" name ==
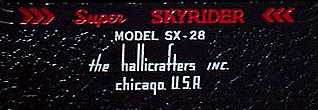
SX-28 "Super Skyrider" logo on front panel

The name "Skyrider" was intended to bestow an aura of exotic adventure to Hallicrafters products and had a long history with the company. The first Hallicrafters set to be dubbed with the name was the 1932 S-1.

== Variations ==
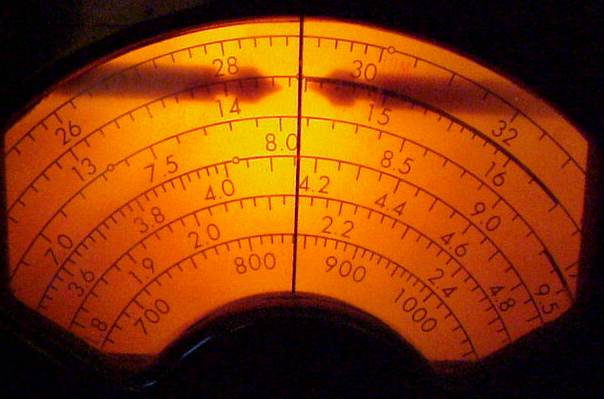
SX-28 tuning dial

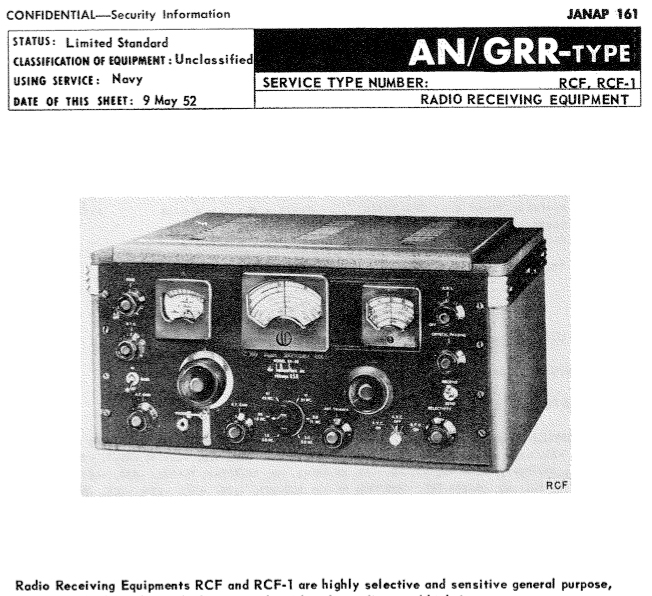
US Government data sheet

Variations and special versions of the SX-28 were produced over the years. During World War II, Hallicrafters continued to redesign portions of the SX-28.

=== Specialty versions ===
- AN/GRR-2 - introduced in February 1944 became the U.S. Navy SX-28A, a ruggedized unit built for U.S. Army Signal Corps and U.S. Navy use.

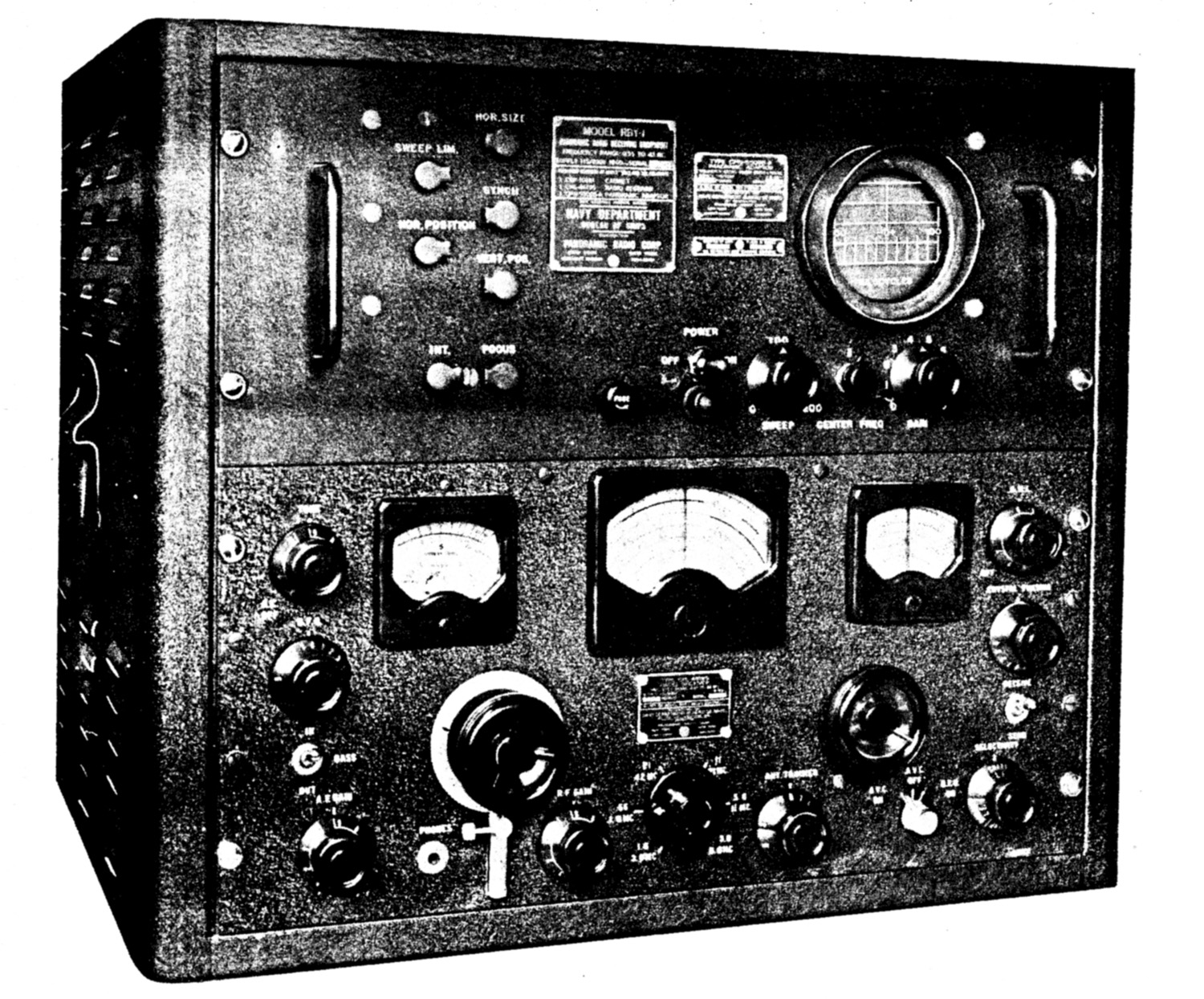
The U.S. Navy RBY-1 Panoramic Radio Adaptor shared a cabinet with the SX-28.

== See also ==
- BC-348
- Hammarlund Super Pro
- National HRO
- R-390A

== General references ==
- de Hensler, Max. The Hallicrafters Story. Charleston, West Virginia: ARCA Press, 1988
- Moore, Raymond. Communications Receivers, Fourth Edition. La Belle, Florida: RSM Communications, 1997
- Osterman, Fred. Shortwave Receivers Past and Present. Reynoldsburg, Ohio: Universal Radio Research, 1998
- Dachis, Chuck. Radios by Hallicrafters. Atglen, Pennsylvania: Schiffer Books for Collectors, 1999
- SX-28 and SX-28A Manuals, VOLs. XII and XVI, Riders Perpetual Troubleshooting Manual
- AN/GRR-2 Manual, Army # TM-11-874, military SX-28A
- QST, July, 1940 to 1946
- ARRL Handbook 1946
