= Hallicrafters =

American radio equipment manufacturer

Hallicrafters Company
- Industry: Electronics
- Founded: 1932
- Founder: William J. Halligan
- Headquarters: Chicago, Illinois, United States
- Products: Radio equipment
- Number of employees: 2,500 (1952)

The Hallicrafters Company manufactured, marketed, and sold radio equipment, and to a lesser extent televisions and phonographs, beginning in 1932. The company was founded by William J. Halligan and based in Chicago, Illinois, United States.

In 1966 Halligan sold the company to the Northrop Corporation and Halligan family involvement ended. Northrop ran the company until the early 1970s, but by this time, fierce Japanese competition was putting pressure on the US domestic electronics market. Northrop sold the company name (but kept the factory, by then located in Rolling Meadows, a Chicago suburb) in 1975, bringing non-military electronics production to an end, and turning the plant into part of Northrop Corporation's Defense Systems Division.

== History ==
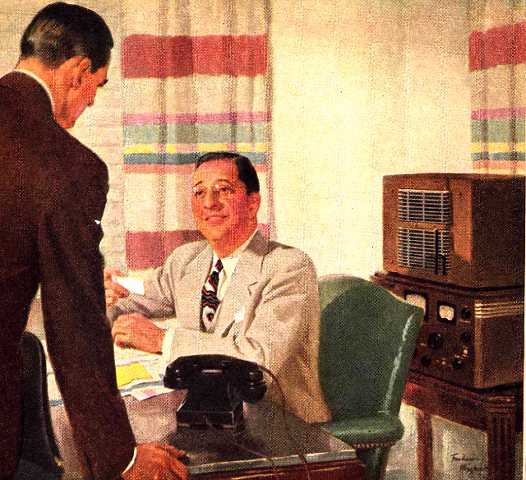
Hallicrafters founder William J. Halligan depicted in a 1944 magazine ad

William J. Halligan (1898–1992), founded Hallicrafters Company in Chicago in late 1932. Prior to this, he had been involved in radio parts sales for some years but decided the time was right for a handcrafted amateur radio receiver – the company name being a combination of Halli(gan) and (hand)crafters.

The new company was located at 417 North State Street and immediately ran into patent difficulties when RCA decided to sue them for building radio sets without an RCA patent license. An opportunity came to purchase the concern of Silver-Marshall Inc. in 1933 and, with it, an RCA patent license as the most valuable asset.

In order to meet their financial obligations, Hallicrafters produced radios for other manufacturers until they were financially able to begin production of their own line of communications receivers, starting with the SX-9 'Super Skyrider', in late 1935.

By 1938, Hallicrafters was doing business in eighty-nine countries and manufactured the most popular sets in the USA. That year, the company began to produce radio transmitters. With the outbreak of World War II, the company prepared for wartime production, and was responsible for new designs and innovations for use by the U.S. troops; probably the best-known were the HT-4/BC-610 and related equipment used in the military SCR-299 communications package.

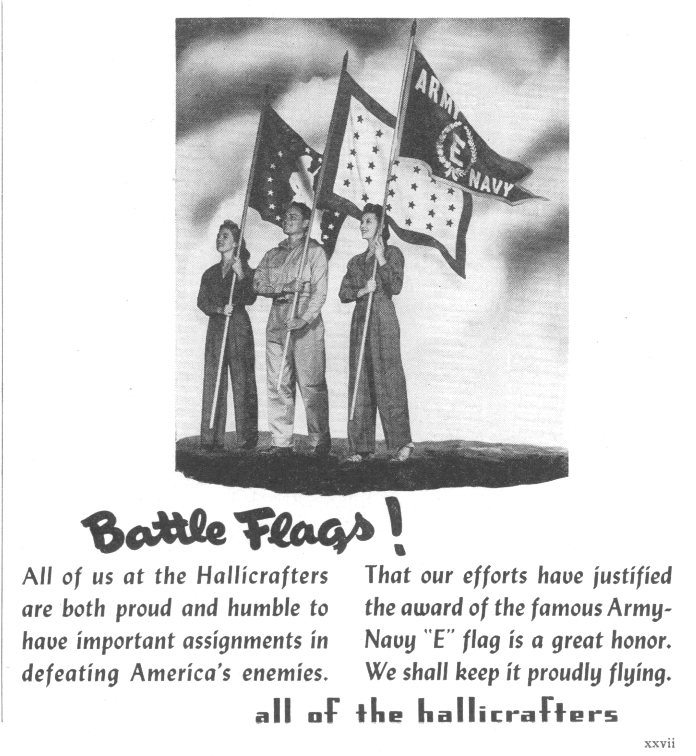
Hallicrafters received Army-Navy ‘E’ Awards for its wartime contributions

Production of Ham radio gear and other items was suspended until 1945. After the war, focus was again on consumer electronics, including radio phonographs, AM/FM receivers, clock radios and televisions.

The boom years for Hallicrafters were from 1945 to 1963, during which the company produced equipment considered by many to be superbly designed, including the famous S-38 receiver, which received a cosmetic "makeover" by industrial designer Raymond Loewy.

1942 ad for Hallicrafters S-20R

In 1952 Hallicrafters' main plant in Chicago housed general offices and the factory and was a block long. In addition to the main plant was a 3-story building of 72,000 square feet (6,700 m^{2}) two blocks away, a 1-story coil plant of 12,000 square feet (1,100 m^{2}) on Chicago's north side, and 150,000 square feet (14,000 m^{2}) of production and storage space in three other buildings within a five-mile radius of the main plant. The company employed 2,500 people.

During the Cold war era, the company took active participation in the Blue Streak (UK) and Atlas (U.S.) missile projects, helped to develop capability for many areas of electronic warfare and in missile field, including code translator data systems, ground support equipment, electronic countermeasures testing and antenna systems, infrared homing techniques, also company provided tactically deployed maintenance and technical support teams for mentioned missile systems, it supplied airborne target simulator system for Nike Zeus, electronic countermeasure systems for Douglas EB-66E and Boeing B-52 aircraft. Its R&D divisions (Manson Laboratories in Wilton, Connecticut, and Military Electronics Division in Chicago) developed penetration aids for intercontinental ballistic missiles and participated in various other classified programs. In the words of its advertising sloganry, the company supported “America’s defense umbrella.”

In 1966 Halligan sold the company to the Northrop Corporation and Halligan family involvement ended. Northrop ran the company until the early 1970s, but by this time, fierce Japanese competition was putting pressure on the US domestic electronics market. Northrop sold the company name (but kept the factory, by then located in Rolling Meadows, a Chicago suburb) in 1975, bringing non-military electronics production to an end. The Hallicrafters plant became Northrop Corporation's Defense Systems Division.

The name and assets of Hallicrafters were traded over the following years, even though there were no products bearing the name. Since around 1988, the remaining assets and rights to the Hallicrafters' name and logos have been held by court-appointed trustees. (Note: one known 1980s product bearing the Hallicrafters name does exist – a 4-line plus intercom telephone.)

Hallicrafters equipment remains in use by collectors and vintage amateur radio enthusiasts.

== Equipment ==
=== Pre-war ===
Some of the more well-known Hallicrafters equipment from the pre-war period include:

- Super Skyrider, model SX-9 (1936), equipped with a large German silver tuning dial, and one of the first receivers to use the new "all-metal" vacuum tubes.
- Ultra Skyrider, model SX-10 (1936), able to tune what were then sometimes referred to as "UHF" bands (frequencies above 30 megahertz).

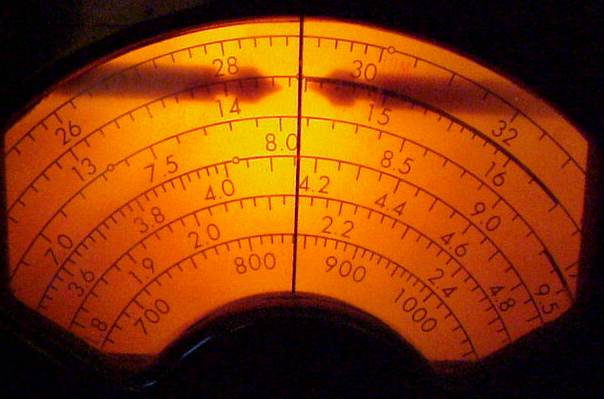
Hallicrafters SX-28 tuning dial

- Skyrider Diversity (1938), actually two complete multi-tube receivers side-by-side. This enabled the operator to connect two different antennas to the set and counteract the effects of fading. A huge set and today, one of the most sought-after models.
- HT-4 Transmitter (1938), an efficient high-performance transmitter for the Ham bands, later to become famous in World War II as the BC-610. It was sold well into the late 1940s.
- Model S-19 Sky Buddy (1938), an octal tube version of the Hallicrafters 5-T receiver.
- Skyrider 23, model SX-23 (1939), famous for its innovative "art-deco" cabinet design.
- Super Skyrider SX-28, (1940–43) and SX-28A (1944–46), one of the most popular Hallicrafters receivers. Its design was state of the art for the time, and featured excellent external styling. The SX-28 was notable for audio that sounded better than many expensive home receivers. It is still easy to find today, and remains a favorite of collectors.

=== Wartime ===
- SCR-299/399 (1942), complete mobile HF station on frequencies from 2–8 MHz (and 1–18 MHz using conversion kits), entire unit came in a K-51 truck except Power Unit PE-95 which was in a K-52 trailer.
- SCR-543/593 (1944), also sold after the war as the model BC-669-B, a medium-range (25–100 nm) portable vehicular and ground set for CAC.
- SCR-593 was a portable receiver.
- S-36A Ultra High Frequency Communications Receiver. Covering 27.8 to 143 MHz in AM or FM

=== Post-war ===
Postwar Hallicrafters models include:

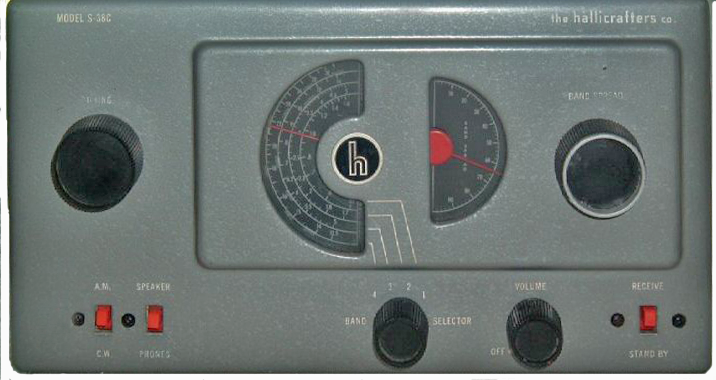
Hallicrafters S-38C receiver, c.1952

- Model S-38 (1947), a "beginner's" receiver. Simple and inexpensive, yet it introduced many to shortwave listening, case designed by Raymond Loewy.
- Model S-38A (1948) Used regenerative IF to serve as a BFO, eliminating a dedicated BFO tube.
- Model S-40 (1946) A multiband single conversion radio with 455 kHz IF. Covered Broadcast Band (Medium Wave) to 44 MHz.
- Model SX-42 (1948), a massive receiver featuring the new FM band. It, too, was popular for its appearance, styled by the famous industrial designer Raymond Loewy. The SX-42 was a dual-purpose receiver; it provided not only shortwave reception, but standard AM broadcast and FM reception.
- Model SX-62 (1949), an updated version of the SX-42, with improved circuitry and cabinet styling.
- Model S-77 (1950), an Amateur-Receiver with the ability to receive AM radio signals.
- Model SX-73 (1952), a professional receiver aimed mainly at the military market, but also available on the civilian market. It was Hallicrafters' answer to the Hammarlund SP-600 Super-Pro.
- Model HT-20 (1952), an all-purpose shortwave transmitter, featuring multi-band switching.
- Model S-85 (1954–5), general coverage (560 kHz-30 MHz/4 bands), single conversion), amateur bandspread (10-80m), dual tuning dials, RF and audio gain controls, beat frequency oscillator (controllable frequency), transmit/receive switch, sold for $119.95 at Sears, Roebuck and Co.
- Model SX-88 (1954), at the time, the finest commercial receiver available. The SX-88 was designed for the operator for whom cost was not a concern, and featured outstanding performance and appearance. Less than 100 are known to exist, as such they are highly prized by ham radio operators.
- Model SX-96 (1954–5), general coverage (560 kHz-30 MHz/4 bands), double conversion, S-meter, crystal filter, amateur bandspread (10-80m), dual tuning dials, RF and audio gain controls, beat frequency oscillator (controllable frequency), transmit/receive switch, sold for ~$169.

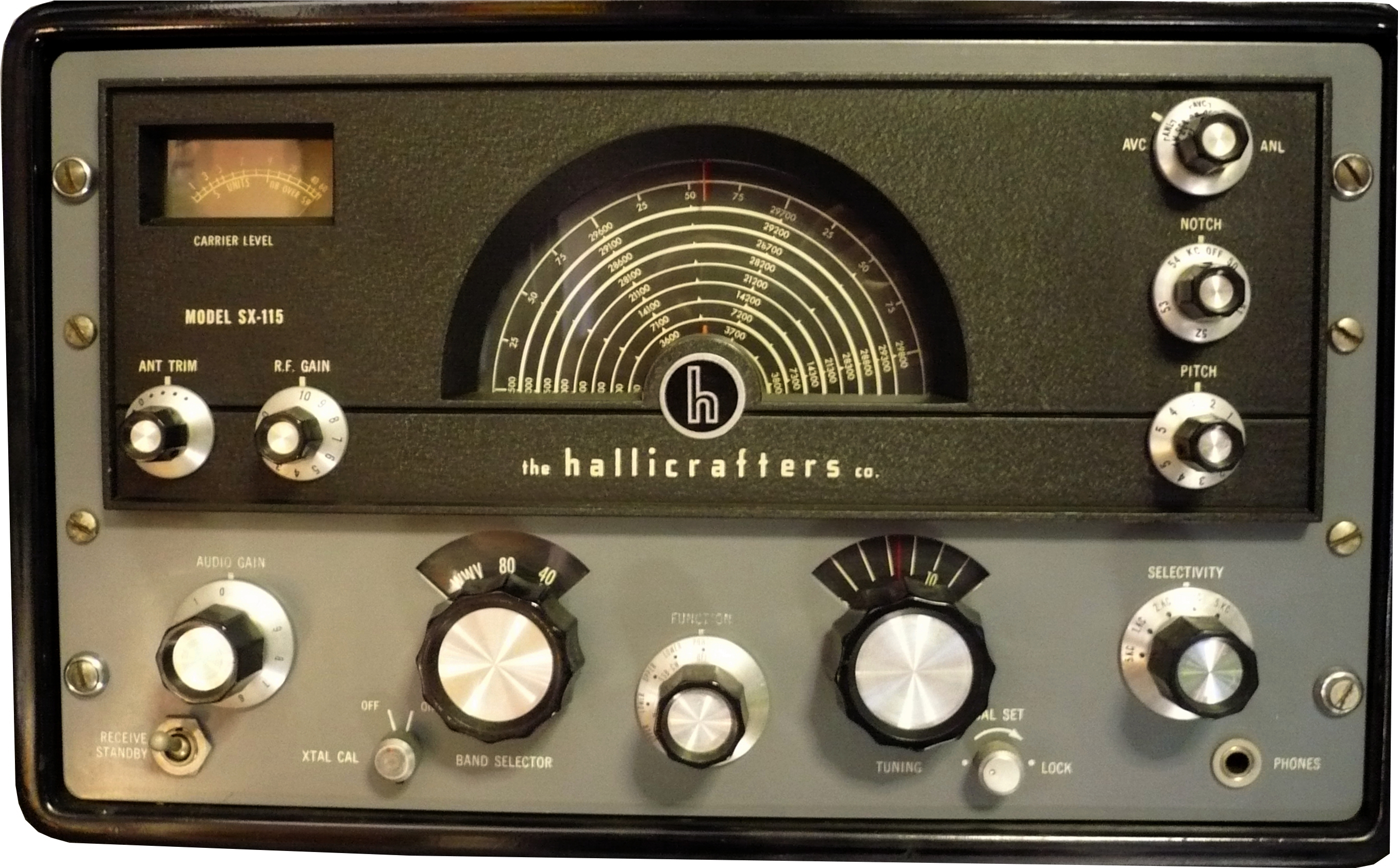
Hallicrafters receiver SX-115, circa 1961

- Model HT-30 (1954), The first single-sideband transmitter made by Hallicrafters.
- Model SX-100 (1955), a double conversion superhet general coverage receiver with SSB capability and bandspread tuning for the 10–80 meter amateur bands.
- Model SX-101 (1956), the first ham band only receiver built by Hallicrafters
- Model HT-32 (1957), the most popular SSB transmitter made by Hallicrafters
- Model HT-37 (1959), a lower cost version of the HT-32, using phasing type SSB generation. A well-designed transmitter, and many are still in service today.
- Model SX-110 (1959–1962) A large receiver for the Amateur Radio (Ham) market.
- Model HT-40/SX-140 (1960) The new "Hallicrafter Twins" were a budget-minded transmitter and receiver for the Novice/Technician market offering 75 watts from 80 – 6 meters AM and CW, crystal controlled; offered as a kit or fully assembled.
- Model SX-115 (1961), yet another large receiver for the Amateur Radio market. It featured a huge central dial, and is another model prized by collectors.

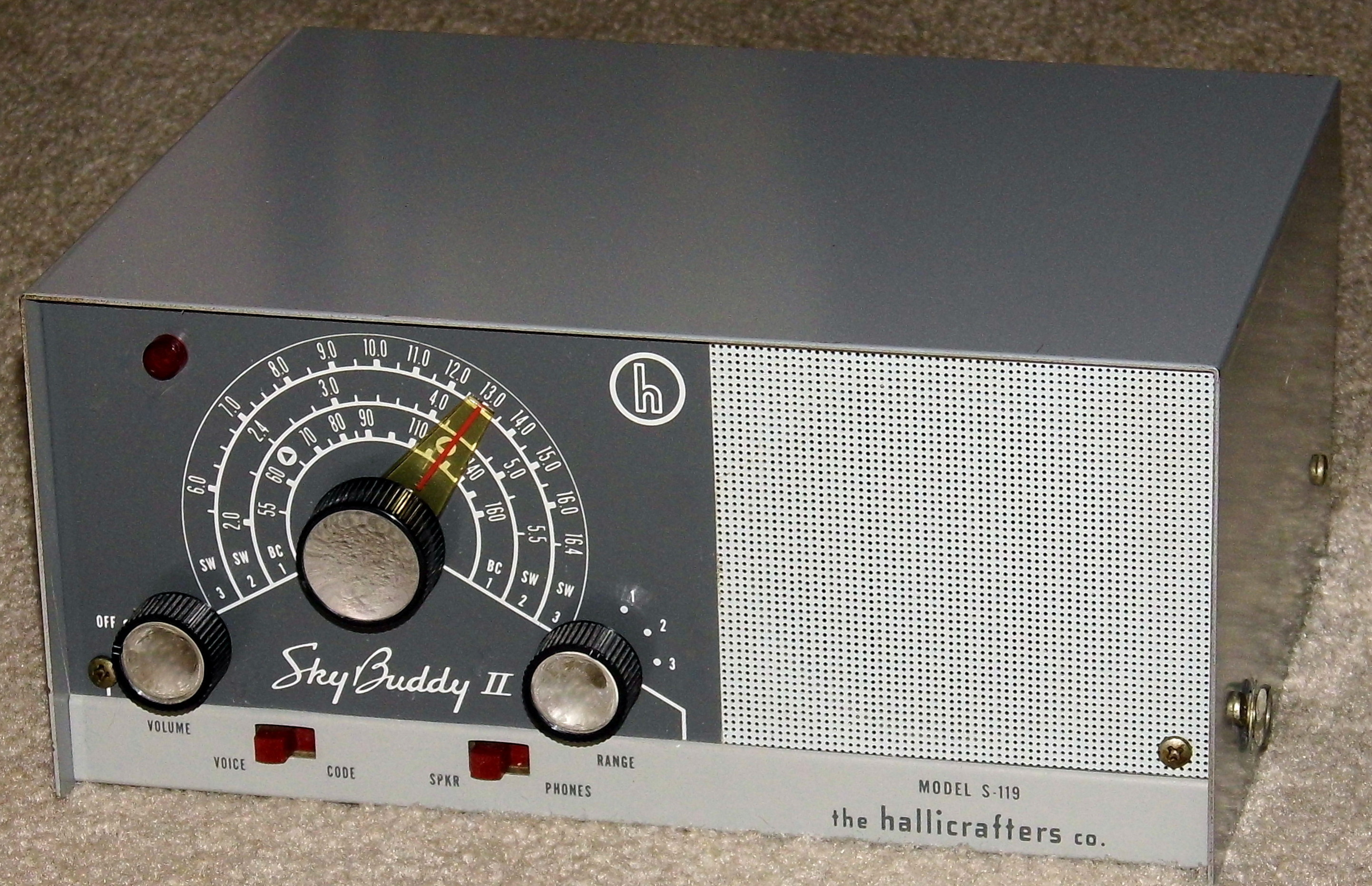
Hallicrafters S-119 Sky Buddy II, circa 1961–1962

- Model S-119 (1961), commemorative Sky Buddy model celebrating the 100th receiver model produced since the original S-19.
- Model SX-117 (1965), triple conversion receiver, covered 10–80 meter amateur radio bands with added 10 MHz WWV.
- Model HT-44 (1962), transmitter with continuous wave (CW) and single-sideband (SSB) capability on 10- to 80-meter amateur radio bands. The HT-44 was the matching transmitter for the SX-117 receiver.

== Sources ==
- de Hensler, Max. The Hallicrafters Story. Charleston, West Virginia: ARCA Press, 1988
- Moore, Raymond. Communications Receivers, Fourth Edition. La Belle, Florida: RSM Communications, 1997
- Osterman, Fred. Shortwave Receivers Past and Present. Reynoldsburg, Ohio: Universal Radio Research, 1998

== See also ==
- Collins Radio
- R. L. Drake Company
- Vintage amateur radio
- Hammarlund
- National Radio Company
- Signal Corps Radio
- Radio Shack (Halligan was an early employee)
