= List of communications receivers =

This is a list of rack-mount or tabletop communications receivers that include short wave frequencies. This list does not include handheld, portable or consumer grade equipment. Those that include VHF or UHF can be termed wideband receivers, whereas those without HF would be termed scanners, or surveillance receivers. Receivers without controls, that are operated or implemented in computers are in the list of software-defined radios.

| Manufacturer | Model | Use | Date Available | Frequencies (MHz) | Mechanism | Modes | Bandwidths (kHz) | Memories | Mass (kg) | Size (mm) | Knobs | Buttons | Sockets (Front) | Remote Control | IP3 (dBm) | ref |
|---|---|---|---|---|---|---|---|---|---|---|---|---|---|---|---|---|
| AKD | HF3 Lowe (SRX-100) | Hobbyist | 1997 | .03-30 | dual conversion | AM LSB USB | 3.8 6 | 1 | 1.8 | 185 × 190 × 65 | 3 | 4 | 0 | | -9 | |
| Alinco | DX-R8T | Hobbyist | | .15-30 | | SSB, CW, AM and FM | 0.5 2 9 | 600 | | 240 x 94 x 255 | 4 | 23 | 2 | USB | | |
| AOR | AR-2300 | | | .04-3150 | black box | USB, LSB, CW, Wide-FM, N-FM, AM (P25) | | | | 216 x 70 x 286 | 0 | 1 | 3 | | | |
| AOR | AR2515 | Hobbyist | 1989–1991 | 5-1500 | quadruple conversion | | | | 1.2 | | | | | | | |
| AOR | AR-3000 | Hobbyist | 1993–2008 | .1–2036 | quadruple conversion | | | 400 | 1.2 | | | | | | | |
| AOR | AR-3030 | Hobbyist | 1994–1997 | .03-30 | triple conversion | SSB, CW; AM, s-AM, FAX, FM | | 100 | 2.2 | | | | | | | |
| AOR | AR-5000 | | 1996-2008 | .01-2600 | triple conversion | AM, USB, LSB, CW/Data, FM-n, FM-w | 3, 6, 15, 40, 110, 220 | 2000 | 3.5 | 217 x 100 x 280 | 4 | 26 | 2 | | | |
| AOR | AR-5001D | Hobbyist | 2010 | .04–3150 | direct sampling for HF; double superhet | USB LSB CW WFM NFM AM S-AM CTCSS DCS DTMF (P25) | .2, .5, 3, 6, 15, 30, 100, 200, 300 | 2000 | 5 | | | | | | +20 | |
| AOR | AR-5700D | Hobbyist | 2019? | .09–3700 | direct (<25MHz) or double conversion | DMR, P25 (Phase 1 & II), TETRA, Motortrbo, dpMR, NXDN, D-CR, D-Star, Alinco, Yaesu | 0.2 0.5 1 3 6 15 30 100 200 | 2000 | 5 | 304 x 220 x 97 | 4 | 26 | 3 | | | |
| AOR | AR-6000 | Hobbyist | 2013 | .009–6000 | direct conversion ≤25, zero IF | USB LSB CW WFM NFM AM S-AM DMR, P25 (Phase 1 & II), TETRA, Motortrbo, dpMR, NXDN, D-CR, D-Star, Alinco, Yaesu MLS, STL and FPU | .2, .5, 3, 6, 15, 30, 100, 200 and 300 | 2000 | 5 | | 4 | 26 | 2 | RS232, USB | +20 | |
| AOR | AR-7000 | Hobbyist | 1998 | .1-2000 | double or triple conversion | AM, USB, LSB, CW, W-FM, N-FM | | 1500 | 3.4 | | 1 | 21 | 1 | | | |
| AOR | AR-7030 | Hobbyist | 1996 | 0-32 | double conversion | AM, s-AM, USB, LSB, CW, DATA, n-FM | 2.2 5.5 7 10 | 100 | 2.2 | 238 x 93 x 227 | 3 | 9 | 1 | 32 key IR RC, RS232 | +1 | |
| AOR | AR-7030+ | Hobbyist | 1997 | 0-32 | double conversion | AM, s-AM, CW, USB, LSB, DATA | 2.2, 4.0, 5.3, 9.5 | 400 | 2.2 | 238 x 93 x 227 | | | | | | |
| AOR | AR-8600 | | 2000-2013 | .53-2040 | | | | | 1.5 | 155x57x197 | 3 | 26 | 1 | RS232 | | |
| AOR | AR-8600Mk2 | Hobbyist | 2010 | .1-3000 | | WFM, NFM, WAM, AM, USB, LSB, CW | 3, 9, 12, 150 | 1000 | 2 | 155x57x197 | 3 | 26 | 1 | RS232 | | |
| AOR | AR-DV1 | Hobbyist | 2015 | .1–1300 | | USB LSB CW WFM NFM AM S-AM INV Tetra C4FM D-Star Alinco digital, P25p1, NXDN MOTOTRBO, dPMR, AMBE+2 | .2, .5, 1.8, 2.8, 3.8, 5.5, 6, 8, 1, 30, 100, 200 | 2000 | 1.5 | | 3 | 26 | 3 | serial USB | | |
| AOR | AR-ONE / AR-ONE-C | Hobbyist | 2002 | .01–3300 | triple conversion | USB LSB CW WFM NFM AM | .5, 3, 6, 9, 15, 30, 110, 220, 300 | 1000 | 2.2 | | 3 | 26 | 1 | 2 RS232 | +2 | |
| AOR | AR-ALPHA II | Hobbyist | 2019 | .9-6000 | | DMR, P25 (Phase 1 & II), TETRA, Motortrbo, dpMR, NXDN, D-CR, D-Star, Alinco, Yaesu | | | | | | | | | | |
| AOR | AR-DV3 | Hobbyist | 2026- | 0.1–3000 | | USB LSB CW WFM NFM AM | .2 .5 1.8 2.8 3.8 5.5 6 8 15 30 100 200 | 2000 | | | 3 | 24 | 2 | | | |
| AWA | CR6A | Government | 1960s | 2-30 | valve 6 band single conversion | AM CW | 0.7 1.5 3 6 | (6) | | 19" x 8.75" x 12.5" | 14 | 0 | 1 | | | |
| AWA | CR6B | Government | 1960s | .2-.545, 2-30 | valve 6 band single conversion | AM CW | 0.7 1.5 3 6 | (6) | | 19" x 8.75" x 12.5" | 14 | 0 | 1 | | | |
| AWA | AR8 | Military | | .14-20 | 2RF front-ends superhet | | | | | | 13 | | 4 | Bowden cable volume and tune | | |
| AWA | I-C6770 | | 1940 | | superhet | | | | | | 5 | 3 | | | | |
| AWA | C6940 | Professional | 1940s | (.015-.5), 1.4-26 | single conversion | AM BFO | | | | | 6 | 0 | 1 | no | | |
| AWA | I-C8388 | Military | | | | | | | | | 10 | | | | | |
| CAI | CR-70 | Professional | 1970-1971 | 2-30 | | AM, RTTY, USB, LSB, CW and ISB | | | 24.97 | 495 x 330 x 457 | 6 | 18 | 2 | | | |
| Collins | 51J-4 | Professional | 1955 | .54-30.5 | 30 bands | CW AM | | | | | 12 | | | | | |
| Collins | R-390 | Government | | | | | | | | | | | | | | |
| Collins | R-390A | Government | 1955-1970 | .5-32 | double conversion 32 band valve | AM CW FSK | 0.1 1 2 4 6 16 | | | | 16 | 0 | 1 | | | |
| Cubic | R-2411V | Professional | | | dual receivers | AM CW FSK LSB USB | 0.5 1 3 8 | 100 per side | | | 4 | 44 | 2 | | | |
| Cubic | R 3050 | Professional | | | | | | | | | 5 | 21 | 2 | | | |
| Cubic | R-3500-20 | Government | | LF MF HF | | | | | | rack | 5 | 21 | 2 | RS232 | | |
| Drake | DSR2 | | 1974 | .01-30 | triple conversion synthesised | | 0.3 1.2 6 | | | | 10 | 3 | 1 | | | |
| Drake | SW2 | Hobbyist | 1997 | .1-30 | | AM, USB, LSB | 2.5 6 | 100 | 3 | 276 x 111 x 194 | 3 | 14 | 0 | IR | +8 | |
| Drake | SW8 | Hobbyist | 1994-2000 | .1-30, 87-108, 118-137 | | AM, SSB, w-FM | | | 4.5 | 292 x 133 x 330 | 3 | 14 | 0 | | | |
| Drake | R8A | | 1995 | .1-30 | double conversion | AM, S-AM, USB, LSB, CW, RTTY, FM | 0.5 1.8 2.3 4 8 | | 5.9 | | 4 | 37 | 1 | | | |
| Hy-Gain / Galaxy | R-530 R-1530 | | 1973? | .5-30 | | AM LSB USB | 2.1 (6) (0.5) | | 10 | | 11 | 1 | 1 | | | |
| Gonset | GR-211 | | 1961-1963 | .55-34 | valve 4 band superhet | | | | | 413 x 203 x 254 | | | | | | |
| Grundig | Satellit 800 | | 2000 | .1-30, 87-108, 118-137 | | AM, SSB, FM | | | 6.6 | 506 x 235 x 226 | 5 | 27 | 1 | | | |
| Hallicrafters | SX-28 | Professional | 1940-46 | .55-43 | superhet 6 band | BFO | | 0 | | | 12 | 2 | 1 | no | | |
| Hammarlund | HQ-120 | | 1938-1944 | | superhet | | | | | 435 x 255 x 311 | 12 | | 1 | no | | |
| Hammarlund | HQ-140-X | Commercial | 1953-1956 | 0.54-31 | superhet | BFO | | 0 | 21.7 | 343 x 513 x 279 | 10 | | 1 | no | | |
| Hammarlund | SP-200 | | | | | | | 0 | 30 | | 12 | 2 | 0 | no | | |
| Hammarlund | SP-600 | | | | | | | 0 | | | 9 | 6 | 1 | no | | |
| Harris | RF-505A | | | 1.6-30 | dual conversion decade knob synthesised | AM ISB LSB USB CW | 0.5 3 10 | | | | 15 | 3 | 1 | | | |
| Icom | R70 | Hobbyist | 1982 | | | | | | | | | | | | | |
| Icom | R71A/E | Hobbyist | 1984 | .5–30 | synthesized superhet | FM AM USB LSB RTTY | W N | few | 7.5 | | 7 | 38 | 2 | IR | | |
| Icom | R72 | Hobbyist | 1990 | | | | | | | | | | | | | |
| Icom | R75 | Hobbyist | 1990 | -60 | triple conversion | SSB AM S-AM CW FM | 2.1 6 12 | 99 | 3 | 94x241x229 | 3 | 35 | 1 | CI-V RS232 | +16 | |
| Icom | R8500 | Hobbyist | 1990 | | | | | 1000 | | | | | | CI-V RS232 | | |
| Icom | R8600 | Hobbyist | 2016 | .01-3000 | direct sample <30MHz SDR + superhet | S-AM, AM, USB, LSB, CW, FM, RTTY, D-STAR, NXDN, dPMR, DCR and APCO P25 | 0.5 2.4 6 15 | 2000 | 4.3 | 220×90×230 | 4 | | | IP, CI-V | +30 | |
| Icom | R9000 | Semiprofessional | 1989-2006 | .1-2000 | | AM, FM, WFM, LSB, USB, CW, FSK | W M N | 1000 | 20 | | 12 | 70 | 2 | | | |
| Icom | R9500 | Professional | 2006 | .005-3335 | dual DSP, OCXO | FM, WFM, AM, USB, CW, FSK and P25 | | 1220 | | | | | | | +40 | |
| JRC | NRD-92 | | | | | | | | | | | | | | | |
| JRC | NRD-93 | | | | | | | | | | | | | | | |
| JRC | NRD-505 | Hobbyist | 1977–1979 | .1-30 | double conversion | SSB, CW, AM, RTTY | | | 10 | | 8 | 12 | 2 | | | |
| JRC | NRD-515 | Hobbyist | 1986 | .09-30 | triple conversion 30 band, knob tune | SSB, CW, AM, RTTY | | 0/24/96 | 7.5 | | 10 | 8 | 1 | | | |
| JRC | NRD-525 | Hobbyist | 1986 | .09-34 | triple conversion | AM, USB/LSB, FM, CW RTTY, FAX | | 200 | 8.5 | | | | | | | |
| JRC | NRD-535 | Hobbyist | 1991 | .1-30 | triple conversion | AM, FM, USB, LSB, CW, RTTY, FAX | .3, .5, 1, 1.8 | | 8.5 | | 9 | 34 | 2 | RS232 | | |
| JRC | NRD-535D | Hobbyist | 199? | .1-30 | triple conversion | AM, FM, USB, LSB, CW, RTTY, FAX, ECSS | .3, .5, 1, 1.8, variable | | 8.5 | | 9 | 34 | 2 | RS232 | | |
| JRC | NRD-545 | Hobbyist | -2008 | | | AM, S-AM, SSB, CW, FAX | | 1000 | | | 9 | 42 | 2 | | | |
| JRC | NRD-345 | Hobbyist | 1997 | .1-30 | triple conversion | AM, S-AM, SSB, CW, FAX | | | 3.5 | | 4 | 32 | 1 | | | |
| JRC | NRD-630 | Professional | -2019- | .09-30 | triple conversion + DSP | CW MCW (A2A H2A) DSB USB LSB FSK FAX ISB | 0.3 0.5 1 2.7 3 6 | 300 | 6.0 | | 6 | 51 | 1 | | | |
| JRC | NRD-1050D | | 1963 | .09-30 | valve single conversion 8 band | | | | 15 | | 10 | 6 | 1 | | | |
| Kenwood | R-300 | Hobbyist | | .17-30 | dual conversion | AM SSB | 2.5 5 | 0 | 7.7 | 362x163x325 | 7 | 8 | 2 | no | | |
| Kenwood | R-600 | Hobbyist | 1982-1985 | .15-30 | triple conversion | AM LSB USB | 2.7 6 | | | | 5 | 3 | 2 | | | |
| Kenwood | QR-666 | Hobbyist | | .17-.41, .525-30 | dual conversion 30 band | AM SSB | 2.5 5 | 0 | 7.7 | 362x163x325 | 7 | 8 | 1 | no | | |
| Kenwood | R-1000 | Hobbyist | 1979-1985 | .2-30 | double conversion PLL | AM USB LSB AM-W | 2.7 6 12 | | | | 5 | 10 | 2 | | | |
| Kenwood | R-2000 | Hobbyist | | .1-30 | | AM, FM, USB, LSB, CW | | 10 | | | 6 | 34 | 2 | | | |
| Kenwood | R-5000 | Hobbyist | | | double conversion | | | | | | 5 | 36 | 2 | | | |
| Kingsley | AR7 | Military | 1940 | .138-25 | valve single conversion | AM BFO (RTTY) | | | | | 9 | 2 | 2 | | | |
| Kneisner & Doering | KWZ30 | Hobbyist | 1997 | .05-30 | dual conversion DSP | USB LSB CW1 CW2 CW3 AM n-FM Digital | 0.05 .2 .3 .5 1 1.8 2 2.3 2.6 3 3.6 4.8 6 9 | | 6 | 305 x 105 x 210 | 2 | 20 | 1 | RS232 | +30 | |
| Lafayette | HE-30 | Semiprofessional | | .55-30 | valve 4 band single conversion | AM BFO | 1.6 4 | | 10 | 178x356x254 | 9 | 2 | | | | |
| Lowe | HF-125 | | | .03-30 | double conversion | AM, USB, LSB, CW | 2.5 4 7 10 | | | | 4 | 5 | 1 | | | |
| Lowe | HF-150 | Hobbyist | 1992-1997- | .03-30 | double conversion | s-AM, AM, USB, LSB | 2.5 7 | 60 | | | 2 | 3 | 1 | | | |
| Lowe | HF-225 | Hobbyist | 1987-1997 | .03-30 | double conversion | AM, USB, LSB, CW | 2.2 4 7 10 | 30 | | | 4 | 5 | 1 | | | |
| Lowe | HF-235 | Commercial | | .03-30 | rack mount double conversion | CW, AM, LSB, USB, FM | 2.2 4 7 10 | 30 | 5.58 | | 4 | 17 | 1 | | | |
| Lowe | HF-250 | Hobbyist | | .03-30 | double conversion | CW, AM, LSB, USB, FM | 2.2 4 7 10 | | | | 3 | 8 | 1 | | | |
| Marconi | AD.87B/8882B R1155 | Air Force | 1939 | .075-18.5 | 5 band superhet | BFO | | | 11 | | 7 | 5 | | | | |
| Marconi | R1475 | Air Force | 1948 | 2-20 | 4 band | CW AM | | 0 | | | 6 | 4 | 2 | no | | |
| McKay Dymec | DR22 | Hobbyist | 1977-1980 | .05-29.7 | pll decade knobs | CW, SSB and RTTY | 4 8 | | 7 | 444x130x381 | 8 | 1 | 1 | | | |
| Murphy | B40 | Navy | 1956~ | .6-30 | single conversion | AM BFO | | | | | 9 | 5 | 4 | | | |
| National | HRO Senior | Professional | ~1936 | 1.7-30 | superhet | | | | 15 | | 6 | | | | | |
| National | HRO 500 | | | .005-30 | 5 band | AM SSB | 0.5 2.5 5 8 | | 10 | 16.5 x 7.675 x 12.75 inch | 10 | 3 | 1 | | | |
| NRP | PAN-1000 | Dutch Government | 1983-1987 | .1-1000 | modular triple conversion 6 front-ends | AM, N-FM, LSB, USB CW, W-FM | 2.4 6 12 100 | | | | 6 | 10 | 4 | | +5 | |
| Plessey | PR152 | | 1962 | .55-30 | double superhet | CW AM | 7 | | | | 9 | 0 | 1 | | | |
| Plessey | PR 2250 | Government | 1980s | | | AM CW USB LSB ISB F | .1, .3, 1.2. 5 | 16 | | | 5 | 42 | 2 | | | |
| Plessey | PRS 2280 | Government | | | | AM USB LSB ISB F | .1, .3, 1.2, 5 | | | | 4 | 44 | | | | |
| Plessey | PRS 2282 | Government | 1985 | | | CW AM USB LSB ISB FM | 0.3 ..... 8 | | 16 | | 4 | 45 | 2 | | | |
| Racal | RA17 | Government | 1954 | .98-30 | Wadley-Loop dual superhet | AM BFO | 0.1 0.3 0.75 1.2 3 8 | | 30.5 | 482 x 267 x 510 | 12 | 6 | 2 | | | |
| Racal | RA117 RA6117A | Government | 1958-1962? | 1-30 | 5 band superhet triple conversion wadley loop | BFO | 0.1 0.3 1.3 3.0 6.5 13 | | 28 | 267x 482. x510 | 13 | 5 | | | | |
| Racal | RA1772 | | | | | ISB USB LSB AM CW FSK | . 8 13 | | | | 11 | 1 | 4 | | | |
| Racal | RA3791 | | | | | FAK ISB USB LSB AM CW FM FSK | (.1)2.7, 3, 6, 12 | | | | 3 | 45 | 1 | | | |
| Racal | RA6790 | Professional | 1979 | .5-30 | fully synthesised | | | | 13.5 | | 3 | 33 | 1 | | | |
| Regco | RG-5554A | Professional | 1983 | .2-30 | double conversion | AM FM CW USB LSB ISB | | | 27 | | 11 | 44 | 1 | IEE-488 | | |
| RCA | AR-88 | Professional | 1940-1945 | .535-32 | 6 band superhet | BFO | | 0 | 45 | | 11 | 0 | 1 | no | | |
| RCA | CR-88 | | 1945 | | | | | | | | 11 | 2 | 1 | no | | |
| Realistic | DX-300 | Hobbyist | | | triple conversion | AM USB LSB | N W | 0 | | | | | | no | | |
| Realistic | DX-302 | Hobbyist | | .01-30 | triple conversion | AM USB LSB | N W | 0 | | 96x233x230 | 8 | 3 | 1 | no | | |
| Realistic | DX-394 | Hobbyist | 1995-1998 | .15-30 | double conversion | AM LSB USB CW | 5.7 6 7.2 | 160 | 2.1 | 96x233x230 | 5 | 30 | 1 | | | |
| Redifon | R50 | | ~1948 | .0135-.026, .095-32 | valve superhet | | | | | | | | | | | |
| Redifon | R50M | | 1951 | .0135-.026, .095-32 | valve double conversion superhet | | 5 settings | | 40 | 545 x 375 x 530 | 11 | | | | | |
| Redifon | R145 | | | .015-30 | 14 bands | BFO | 0.3 1 4 12 | | | | 11 | 4 | 2 | no | | |
| Redifon | R 408 | Marine | ~1968 | .013-28 | 16 bands | | | | 25.5 | 420x220x500 | 11 | 2 | 2 | | | |
| Redifon | R 470 | | ?1967 | | semiconductor superhet | | | | | rack | 6 | 4 | | | | |
| Redifon | R551 | Marine | ~1975 | .015-30 | double conversion three dial entry synthesiser solid state | LSB USB MCW CW AM=DSB | 1 3 8 | 0 | 17 | 130x 480x490 | 8 | 4 | 2 | | | |
| Rohde & Schwartz | EK-07 | | 1956-1966 | | double conversion valve | | | | 65 | 540 x 325 x 552 | 11 | 2 | 6 | | | |
| Rohde & Schwartz | EB-200 | Government | 1997 | .01-30 | | AM, FM, LSB, USB, CW, Pulse, I/Q | | | | | 4 | 35 | 2 | RS232, LAN | | |
| Rohde & Schwartz | ESH3 | Government | | .009-30 | | F3 A3Ju A3Jl A3 A1 A0 | .2, .5, 2.4, 10 | | | | 2 | 47 | 5 | | | |
| Rohde & Schwartz | EB 150 | | | .009-3000 | | | | | | | 4 | 37 | 2 | USB | | |
| Rohde & Schwartz | EB500 | | | .008-6000 | | | | | | | 3 | 37 | 2 | USB | | |
| Rohde & Schwartz | EK 890 | | | .01-30 | | | | | | | 27 | 3 | 1 | | | |
| Sony | CRF-220 | | | .15-.4, .53-1.6, 1.6-30, 88-108 | | AM LSB USB | normal narrow | | | | 16 | 7 | 6 | | | |
| Tecsun | S2000 | Listener | 2019- | .1-30, 86-108, 118-137 | dual conversion | AM LSB USB FM | 10 20 | 1000 | 5 | 450x250x230 | 7 | 33 | 2 | | | |
| Telefunken | E104 | | 1950s | | valve | | | | 86 | | | | | | | |
| Telefunken | E127 KW4 KW5 | | lat 19502 | | 5 band superhet valve | | | | 44 | | | | | | | |
| Telefunken | E724 | | | | | | | | | | | | | | | |
| Telefunken | E863 | | 1970s | 1.6-30 | | | | | | | | | | | | |
| Telefunken | E1500 | | | | | | | | | | | | | | | |
| Telefunken | E1501 | | | .01-30 | | | | | | | | | | | | |
| Telefunken | E1800 | Government | 1985 | .01-30 | | A1B A3E J3E B8E J7B F1B/F7B F1C F3E | .1 .3 .6 1.5 3 10 | | | | 4 | 48 | 1 | | | |
| Telefunken | E1800/3 | Government | 1985 | .01-30 | | | | | | | | | | | | |
| Telefunken | E1800/A | Government | 1994 | .0003-30 | DSP | CW RTTY SSB FAX MFSK PSK QPSK DSB VSB FM | | | 15 | | | | | RS232, RS423, RS422, RS485, IEC625, IEEE488 | | |
| Ten Tec | RX340 | Commercial | 2000- | .05-30 | triple conversion DSP | USB, LSB, ISB, CW, AM, s-AM and FM | -1 to 16 (57 values) | 100 | 5.7 | 133 x 483 x 318 | 6 | 44 | 1 | RS-232 | | |
| Various | BC-224 | Military | 1936-194? | .2-.5, 1.5-18 | valve six band | AM, CW, MCW | | 0 | 18.1 | | | | | | | |
| Various | BC-312 | Military | 1930s | 1.5-18 | valve six band | AM, CW, MCW | | 0 | 22 | | 8 | 2 | 8 | | | |
| Various | BC-348 | Military | 1940-1946 | .2-.5, 1.5-18 | valve six band | AM, CW, MCW | | 0 | 20 | | | | | | | |
| VEB | EKD 100 | | 1975 | | | | | | | | | | | | | |
| VEB RFT | EKD 300 | Government | 1980 | .014-30 | double conversion | A1A A3E J3C BR8E B8E F1B F3C | | | | | 11 | 12 | 2 | | | |
| VEB | EKD 500 | Government | 1986 | .014-30 | double conversion | AM, USB, LSB, CW, FAX, ISB | .15 .4 .75 1.75 3.1 6 | 99 | 25 | | 6 | 28 | 2 | yes | | |
| VEB | EKD 700 | Prototypes | 1990s | | | | | | | | 3 | 30 | 2 | | | |
| Watkins-Johnson | HF-1000 | Professional | 1993-1999 | .005-30 | triple conversion DSP | ISB, USB, LSB, CW, FM, SAM, and AM | 0.056...(56) 8 | 100 | 6 | 133 x 486 x 508 | 6 | 45 | 1 | RS-232C and CSMA | | |
| Watkins-Johnson BAE | WJ-8711A | Professional | 1990-2010 | .005-30 | | s-AM, AM, CW, LSB, USB, ISB, FM | .056 to(66) 16 | 100 | | | 6 | 45 | 1 | RS232 | | |
| Watkins-Johnson | WJ-8718A | Professional | 1982 | .005-30 | triple conversion | AM FM USB LSB ISB CWV CWF | .3 1 3.2 6 16 | | 16 | | | | | IEE488 | | |
| Yaesu | FRG7 | Hobbyist | 1976-1980 | .5-30 | Triple conversion Wadley loop | AM, LSB, USB, CW | | | 7 | | 7 | 5 | 2 | | | |
| Yaesu | FRG-100 | Hobbyist | Aug 1992 | .05-30 | | AM (FM) LSB USB CW | (.25) (.5) 4 6 | 50 | 4.7 | 238x93x243 | 4 | 24 | | CAT | | |
| Yaesu | FRG-7000 | Hobbyist | 1977-1980 | .25-30 | Triple conversion Wadley loop | AM, LSB, USB, CW | 3 6 | no | | | 7 | 7 | 2 | no | | |
| Yaesu | FRG-7700 | Hobbyist | 1981-1984 | .015-30 | | AM, SSB, CW and FM | | (12) (72) | 6 | 330 x 127 x 254 | 8 | 11 | 2 | | | |
| Yaesu | FRG-8800 | Hobbyist | 1984-1993 | .015-30 | triple conversion | AM, SSB, CW, FM | | 12 | 6.1 | 334 x 118 x 225 | 8 | 38 | 2 | CAT | | |
| Yaesu | VR-5000 | Hobbyist | | .1-2600 | | LSB USB CW AM-N AM WAM FM-N WFM | | yes | | | 3 | 28? | | | | |

== See also ==
- List of amateur radio transceivers
- List of radios

== Extra reading ==
- Osterman, Fred (2014). Shortwave Receivers Past and Present: Communications Receivers 1942-2013. Universal Radio Research. ISBN 978-1-882123-02-5.
