= Hallicrafters SX-117 =

Radio communications receiver

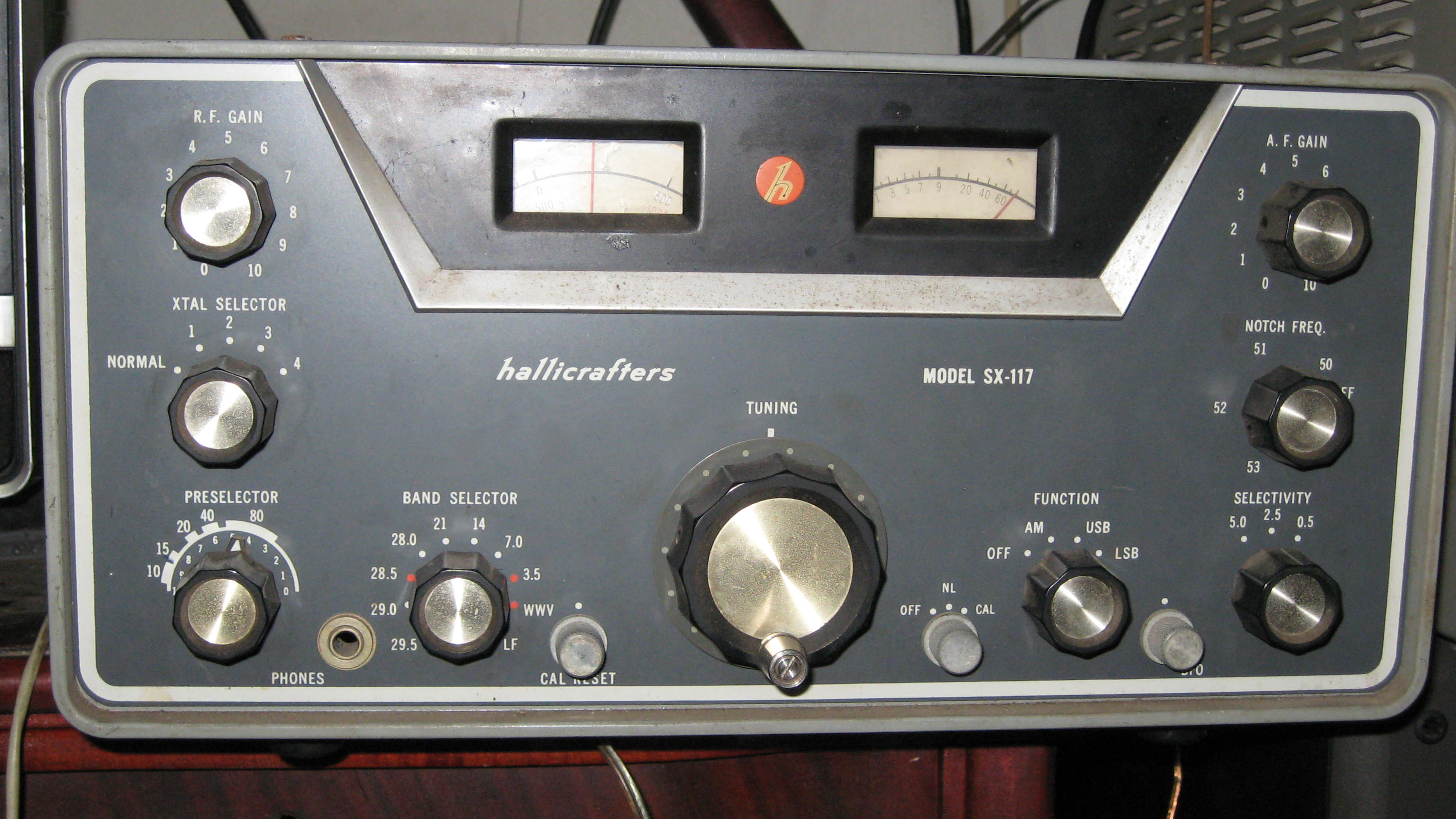
Hallicrafters SX-117

The Hallicrafters SX-117 was a radio communications receiver manufactured by the Hallicrafters company in the 1960s.

== Description ==
The SX-117 was a triple conversion intermediate frequency receiver designed to cover the 10 meter to 80 meter amateur radio bands with an additional band switch setting for WWV on 10 MHz. The first and third conversion oscillators were crystal-controlled. The second was variable from 6 to 6.5 MHz. Introduced in 1962 at a price of $379.95, it had a product detector for SSB, a notch filter, and selectable bandwidth of 0.5, 2.5, and 5 kHz. In addition to the ham bands, general coverage was possible for most frequencies in 500 kHz segments from 85 kHz to 30 MHz with appropriate crystals. For frequencies below 3 MHz, the HA-10 LF/MF converter was an optional accessory costing $24.95. The receiver featured 13 vacuum tubes plus solid state rectifiers and a noise limiter.

=== Specifications ===
- Input Voltage: 105-125 VAC 50/60 Hz.
- Power Consumption: 70 W.
- Sensitivity listed: >.5 to 1 microvolt.
- Audio Output Impedance: 3.2 ohms or 500 ohms.
- Audio Output Power: (3.2 ohms) 3.5 (W.P.P.)
- Antenna impedance: 50-75 ohm unbalanced.

== Gallery ==
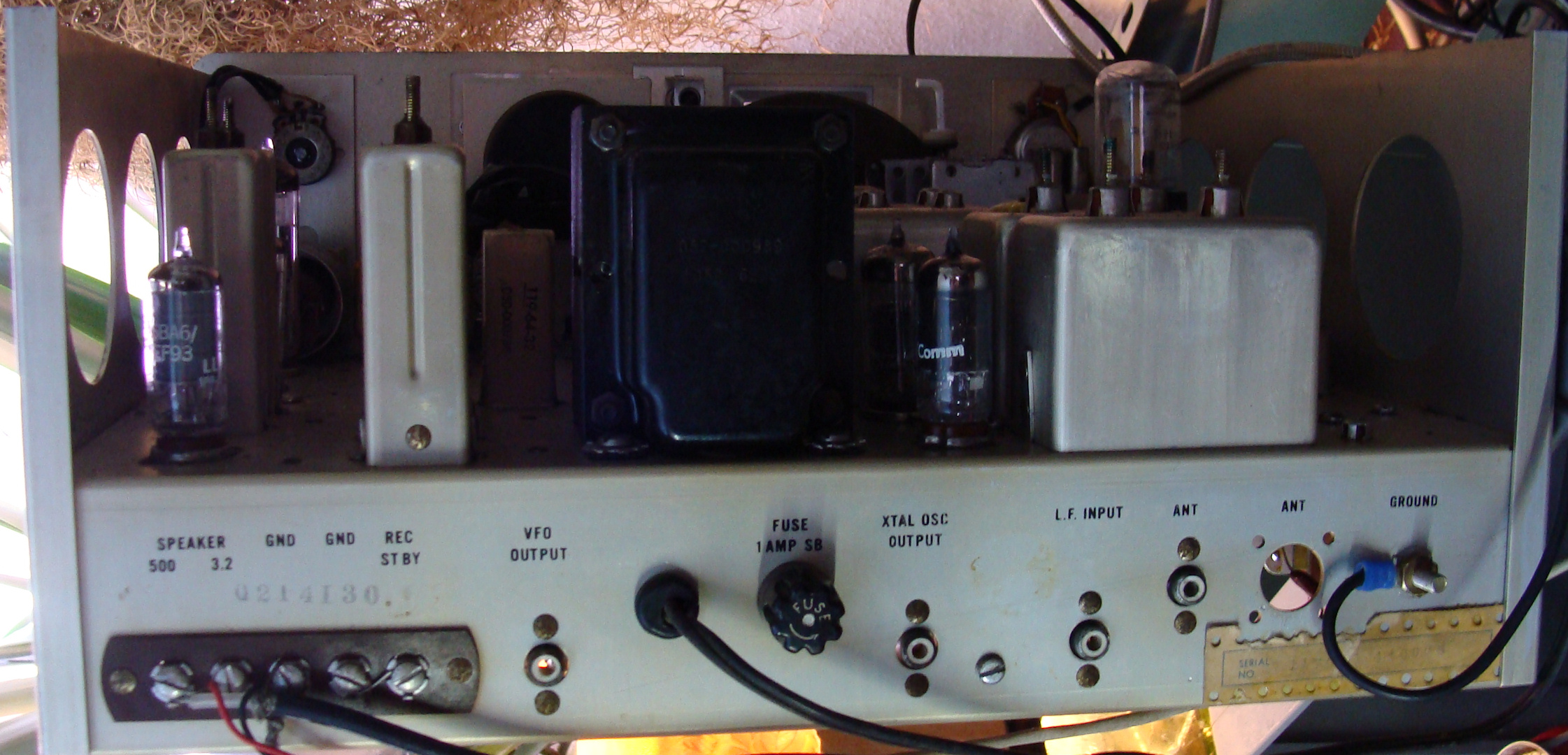
Hallicrafters SX-117 receiver back view.

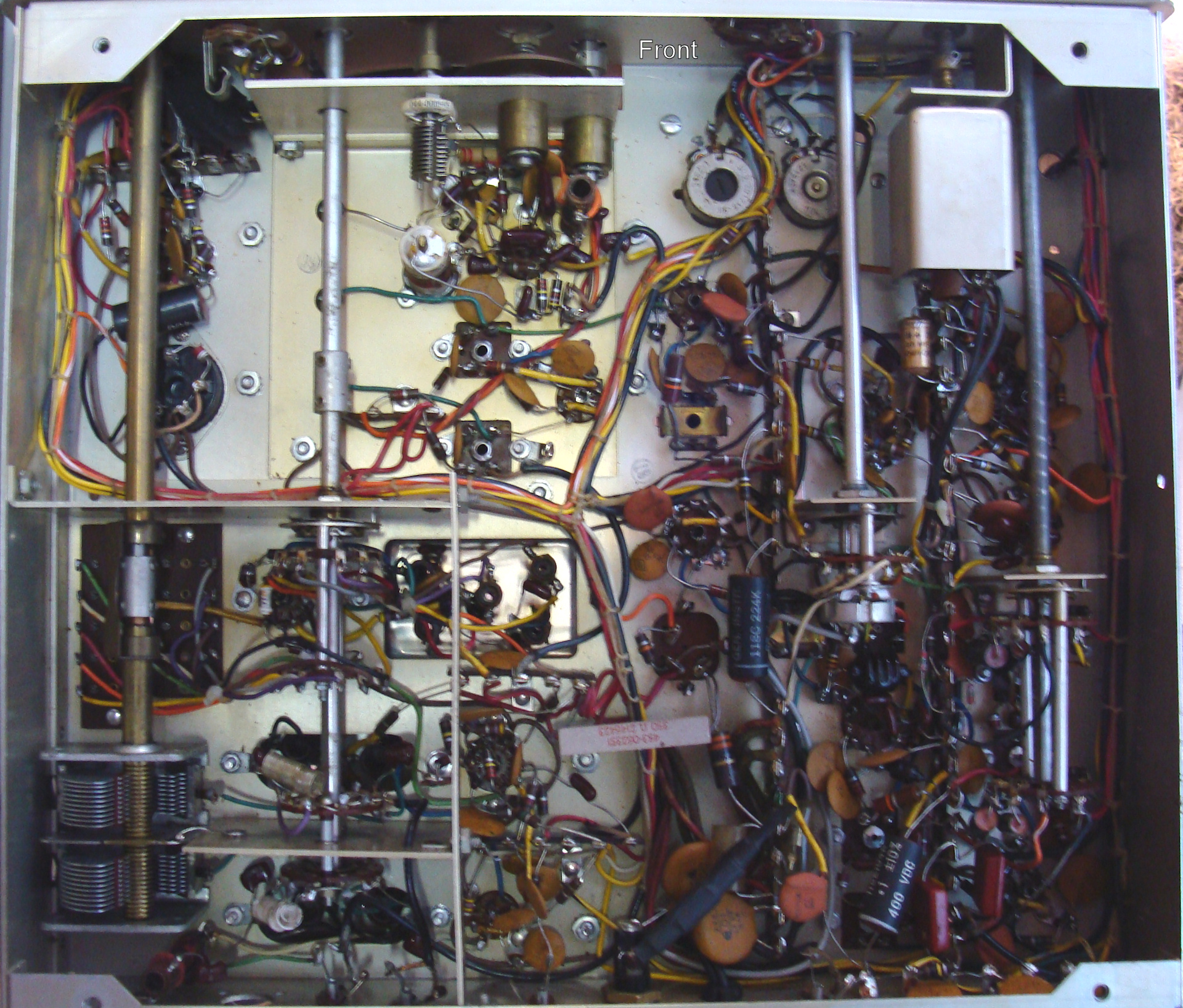
Hallicrafters SX-117 receiver underchassis view.

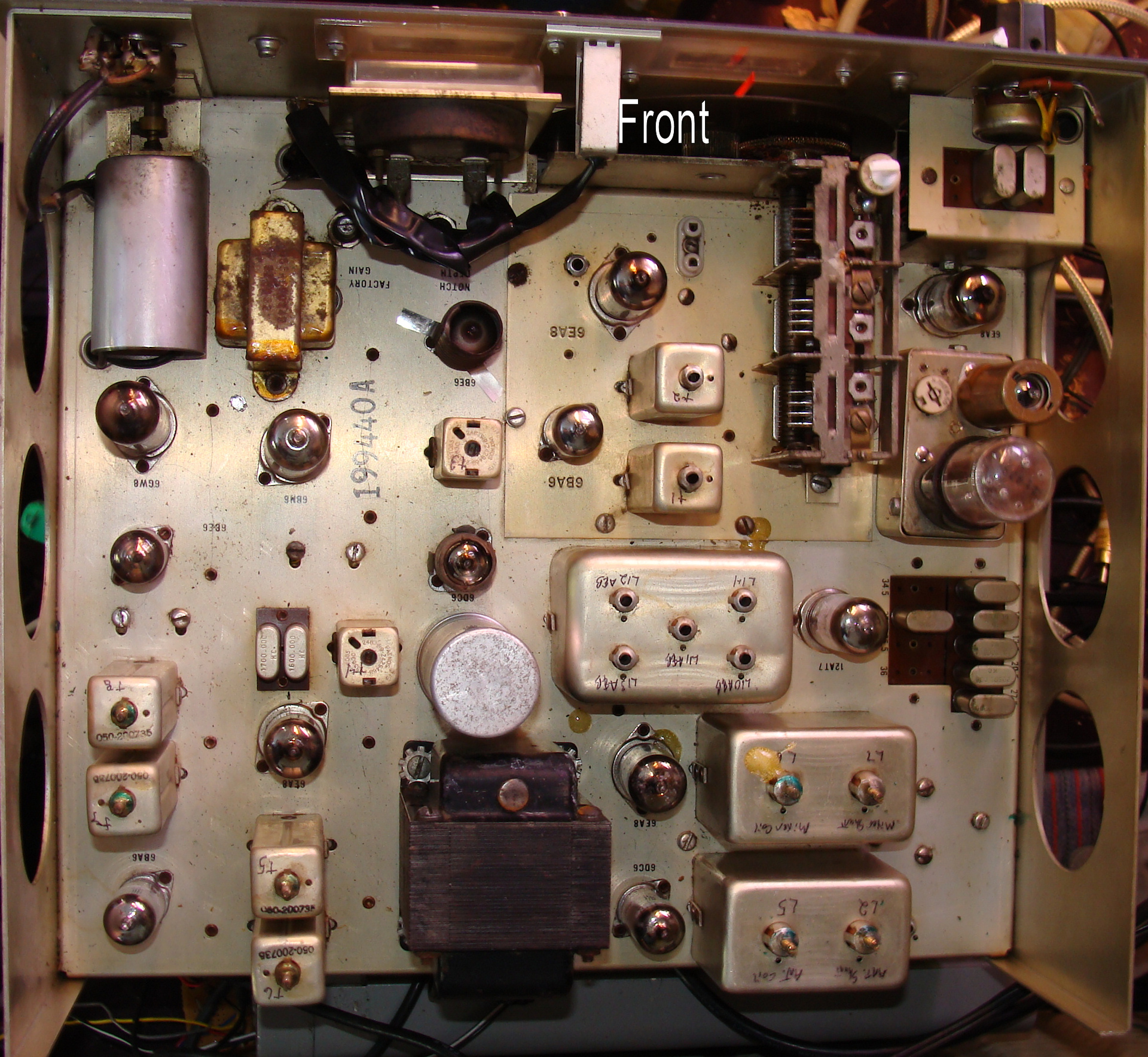
Hallicrafters SX-117 receiver top view.

== See also ==
- Communications receiver
- Hallicrafters
- Vintage amateur radio
