= National HRO =

Shortwave general coverage communications receive

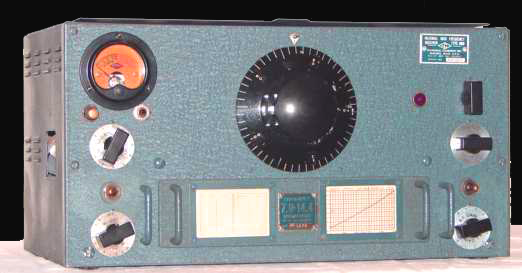
National HRO receiver, c. 1938

The original National HRO was a 9-tube HF (shortwave) general coverage communications receiver manufactured by the National Radio Company of Malden, Massachusetts, United States.

== History ==
James Millen (amateur radio call sign W1HRX) in Massachusetts was in charge of the mechanical design. According to several accounts, Herbert Hoover, Jr. (amateur radio call sign W6ZH), son of U.S. President Herbert Hoover, and Howard Morgan (of Western Electric) designed the electronics in Hoover's garage in Pasadena, California. Dana Bacon (W1BZR) was also involved and wrote about the receiver as second author with James Millen. Some of National Radio's tool makers marked their overtime slips with HOR for "Hell Of a Rush." Management decided that a version of that abbreviation should be the name of the new receiver, choosing the slight alteration HRO to make it less objectionable. That was quickly countered by saying that HRO stood for "Helluva Rush Order".

The HRO receiver was announced in QST magazine in October 1934 and shipped in March 1935, incorporating many design features requested by the fledgling airline industry that were also attractive to the amateur radio community. According to the 1935 instruction manual, the HRO price was US$233, the external power supply (to reduce heat in the receiver cabinet and hum) was US$26.50 less tubes, and a 7000 ohm speaker in a rack panel was US$30.00.

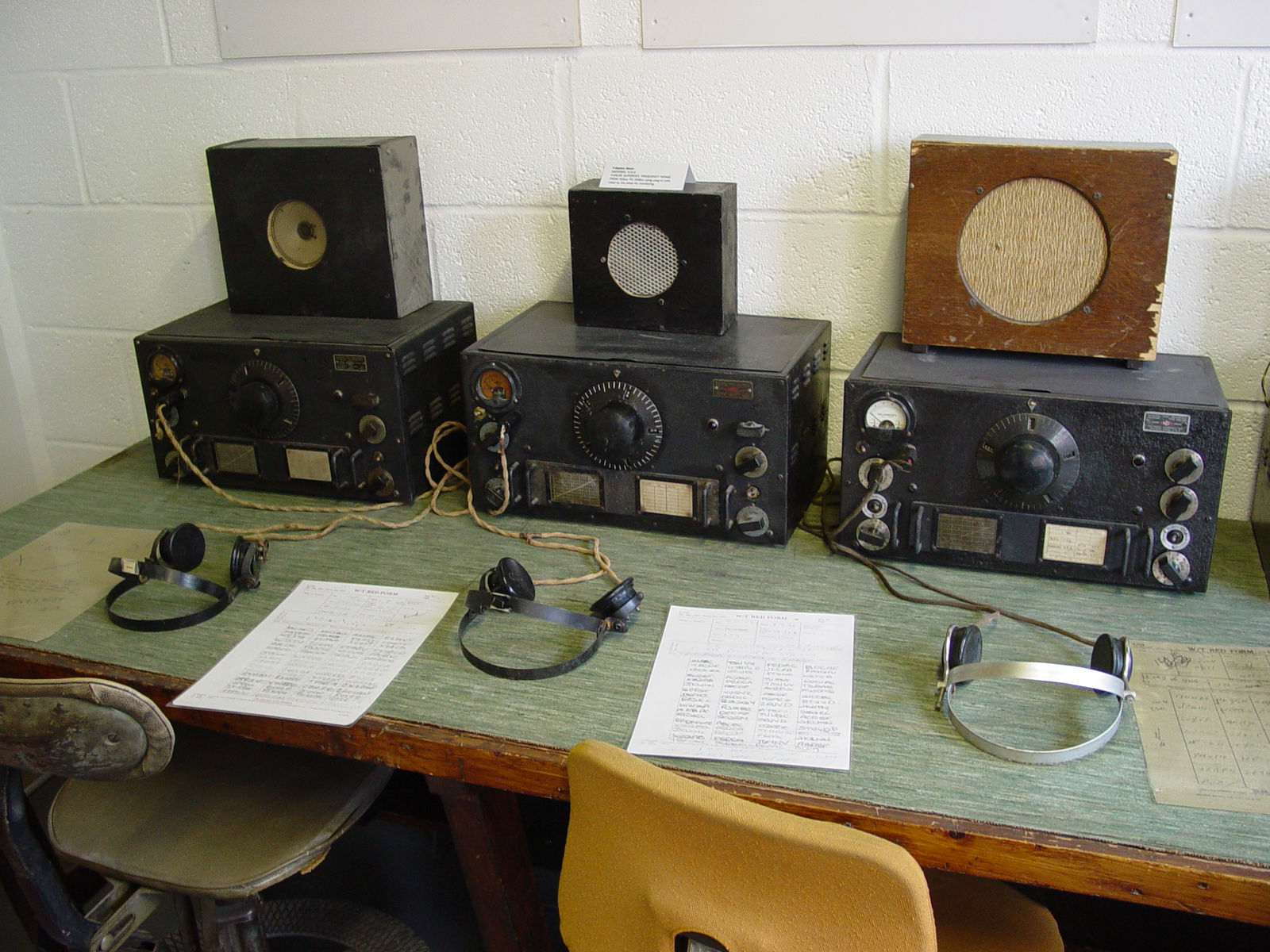
HRO receivers on a table in Block B Museum, Bletchley Park, Milton Keynes, United Kingdom.

The HRO found widespread use during World War II as the preferred receiver of various Allied monitoring services, including Y-Service stations associated with the code-breaking group at Bletchley Park (Station X) in England. An estimated 1,000 standard HROs were initially purchased by Great Britain, and approximately 10,000 total saw use by the British in intercept operation, diplomatic communications, aboard ships and at shore stations as well as for clandestine use.

== Features ==
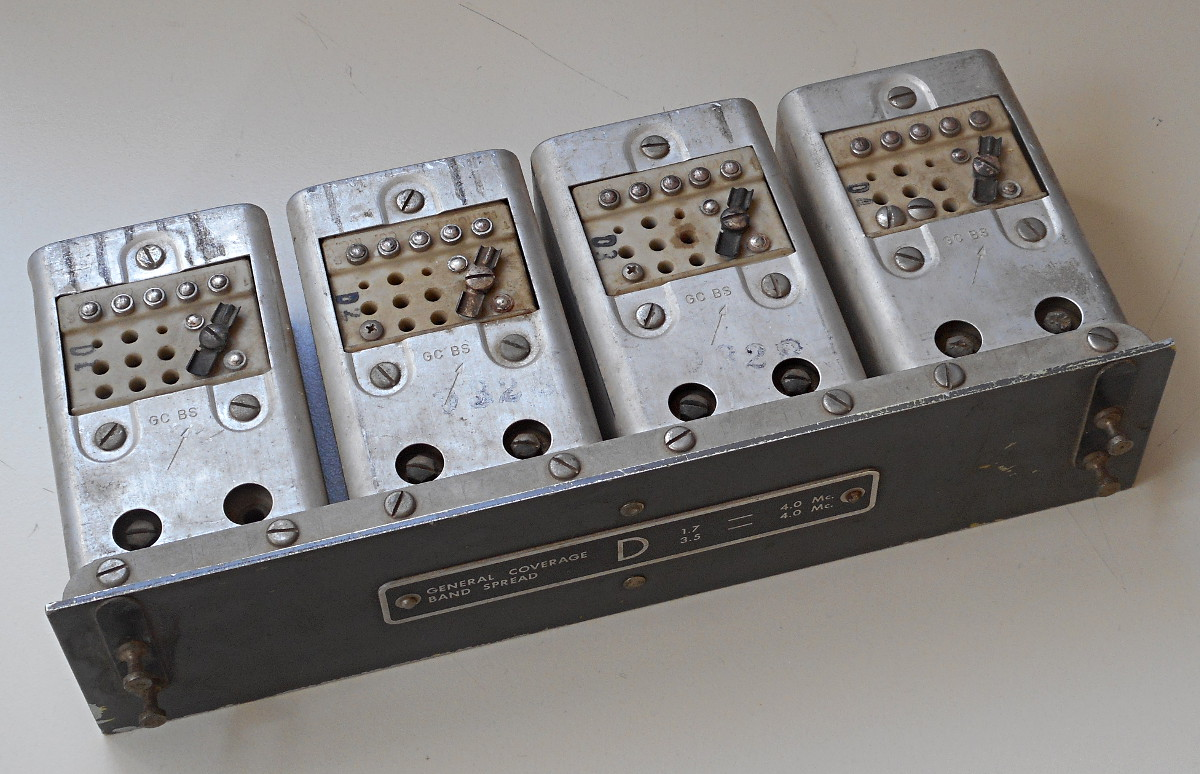
Plug-in tuning coil set D for the HRO-60 receiver.

The two most distinctive features of this radio were its use of a micrometer-type dial, and plug-in sets of tuning coils that slid into a full-width opening at the bottom of the front panel. The dial, designed by Willam Graydon Smith, allowed for continuous analog tuning while digitally indicating incremental progress over a range of ten full turns of the large tuning knob that tuned with velvet smoothness. Ten times the circumference of the dial is 12 feet (nearly 4 m), which allowed for great frequency resolution. The four standard sets of coils, A, B, C, and D, covered 14–30, 7–14.4, 3.5–7.3, and 1.7–4 MHz, respectively. Two other sets of coils, E and F, sold separately, covered 960–2,050 kHz and 480–960 kHz, respectively. Before each radio left the factory, a technician custom calibrated a set of A, B, C, and D coils for that particular radio, a process that took nearly 4 hours. Each of the four main sets of coils also had bandspread modes set by moving screws that limited the frequency range to 28–29.7, 14–14.4, 7–7.3, 3.5-4 MHz, respectively, for amateur radio use.

== Models ==
Main HRO models:

- HRO (also called HRO-Sr, 1935–1943)
- HRO-Jr (February 1936 – 1943, US$100 version of Sr with only one coil not individually aligned to the receiver and lacking crystal filter, phasing control, and signal strength meter)
- RAS (1939-?, HRO-Jr for the U.S. Navy with general coverage coils and 175 kHz IF so the radio could receive the 500 kHz distress frequency)
- HRO-M (used in conjunction with Bletchley Park)
- HRO-5 (1944–1945, octal tube version)

There were also several sub-variations on these models.

== Production ==
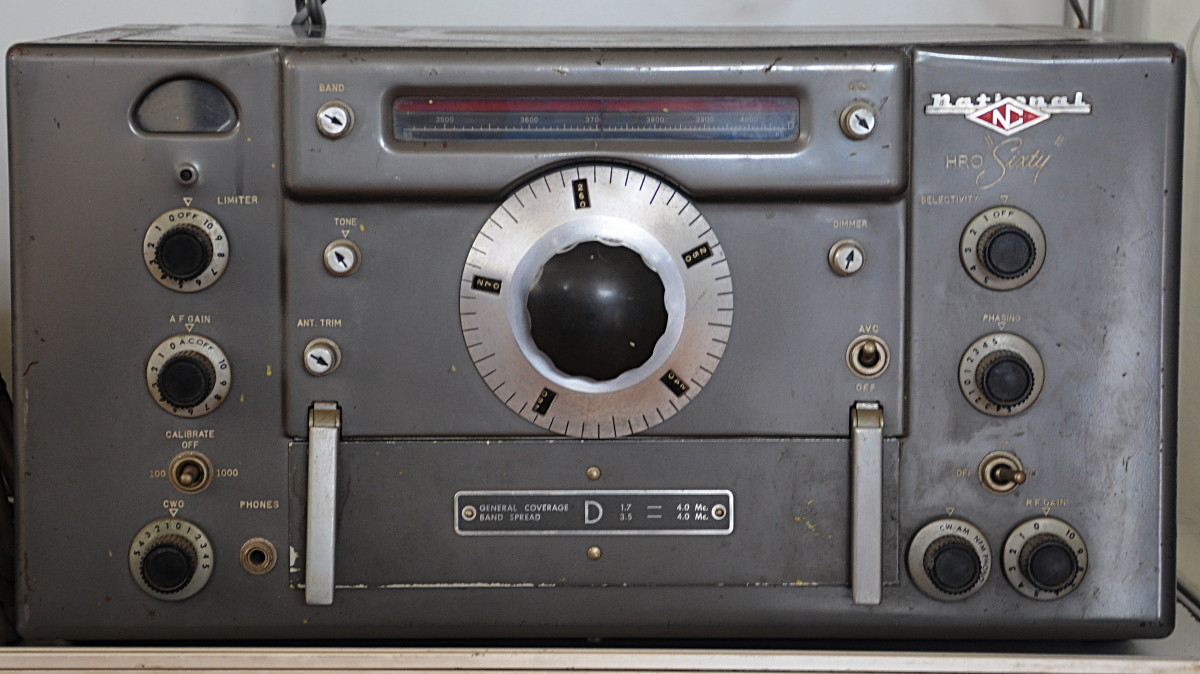
National HRO-60 receiver (1952–1964)

The U.S. military told National, "Start building HROs. We'll tell you when to stop." Before, during, and after World War II, the HRO concept of using plug-in coils with micrometer tuning was copied in several countries, including Germany and Japan. The best-known copies are probably two German models widely employed as monitoring receivers by the German services, the KST made by Korting Radio and the R4 made by Siemens.

Following World War II came the HRO-7 (1947–1949, 12 tubes, including 2 miniature tubes), HRO-50 (1949–1950, built-in tuning dials and power supply, push-pull audio amplifier, improved styling and performance), HRO-50-1 (1951, increased IF selectivity), and HRO-60 (1952–1964, dual conversion for coils B (7–14.4 MHz) and A (14-30 MHz), heater current regulation for the HF oscillator and mixer tubes). These were followed by two solid-state receivers that did not use plug-in coils: the HRO-500 (October 1964 – 1972, 5 kHz-30 MHz, and HRO-600 (1970-1972?, 16 kHz-30 MHz). Breaking with tradition, the HRO-600 used a frequency counter instead of a micrometer tuning dial. Ironically, the HRO-600 used nixie tubes for its digital frequency display and thus was, technically, no longer "all solid-state" as its predecessor, the HRO-500, had been.

HRO receivers were said to be outstanding and continued to be popular although even better and more expensive general coverage receivers from such companies as Collins Radio became available in the 1950s and later. One can still find HRO receivers dating back to the original model that have been restored by vintage amateur radio enthusiasts and other hobbyists.

== See also ==
- ARC-5
- ART 13 transmitter
- BC-348
- BC-654
- Hammarlund super pro
- R-390A
