= Intercom telephone =

Type of telephone not connected to the general telephone network

An intercom telephone is a special kind of telephone that controls an intercom system. Intercom telephones can be found in residential, commercial, and educational settings.

For an example, a school is an environment that displays all the capabilities of an intercom telephone. Using an intercom telephone, administrators can make announcements over loudspeakers that are heard by the entire building, but they can also call a specific classroom's intercom by dialing the room number of that classroom. Intercom telephones can be interfaced with a building's access control system.

== See also ==
- Courtesy telephone
- Speaking tube
