= Clandestine radio =

Clandestine radio may refer to:

- Covert listening device
- Foxhole radio
- Number stations
- Pirate radio
- Clandestine radio broadcasting
