= Hammarlund Super Pro =

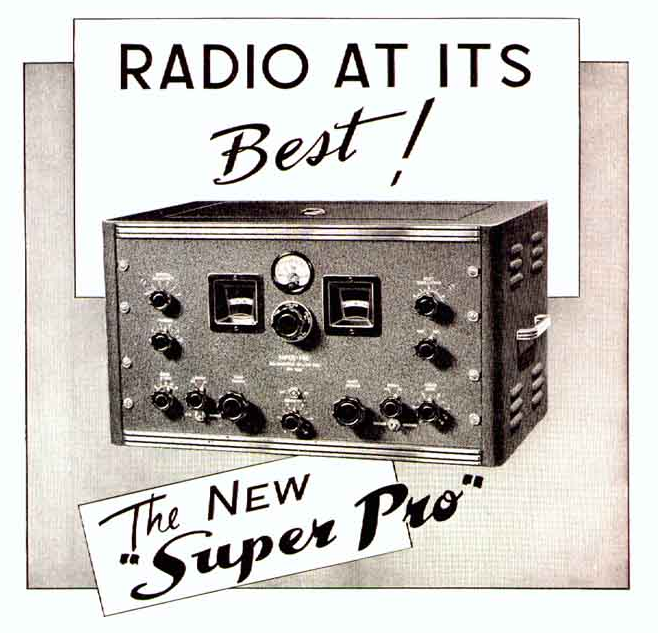
1939 ad for the SP-200 Super Pro

The Hammarlund Super Pro was an American-made radio communications receiver.

== History ==
In March 1936, the Hammarlund Manufacturing Company initiated the first of the famous "Super-Pro" line, the SP-10 receiver, followed in January 1937 by the SP-100. Their efforts to improve the design resulted in October 1939 with the SP-200 series, an 18-tube, single conversion superhet receiver. The SP-200 series Super-Pro receivers were manufactured through 1945, with thousands delivered to the military during World War II; they saw wide use by the U.S. Signal Corps as the BC-779 and the BC-794. During World War II, government agencies like the FBI used the 200 Series Super-Pro at their listening posts. Many were used at ground stations in England to communicate with the Royal Air Force and U.S. Air Force armadas that flew bombing missions over Germany. According to a November 1940 QST Magazine ad, "The fact that 'Super-Pro' receivers are used extensively by the U.S. Signal Corps and many other governmental departments, speaks for itself." At the end of the war, the market was flooded with surplus Super-Pro receivers at bargain prices, which may be a reason many working examples of this model are still found today. From 1946 to 1948, Hammarlund produced the SP-400 Super Pro for the amateur radio market. In 1947 the SP-600 Super-Pro receiver, which surpassed the SP-200 in performance, was introduced. The SP-600 series were widely used throughout the world for military, laboratory and commercial application.

== Specifications ==
=== SP-200 ===
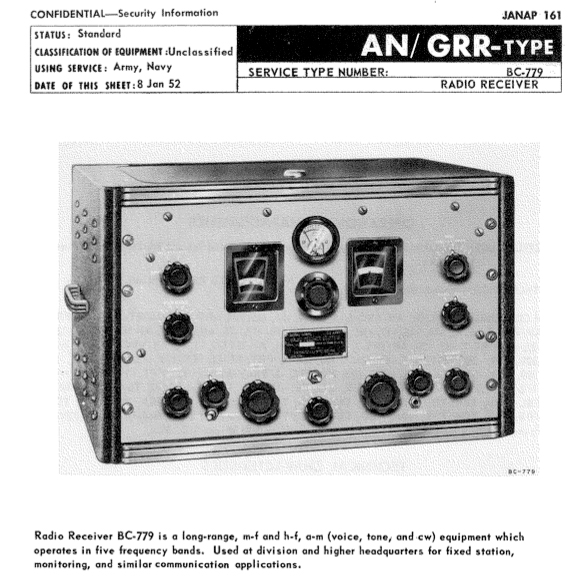
SP-200 Super Pro

Various models of the SP-200 series cover 0.1–40 MHz in 5 bands. The radio and cabinet weigh 73 pounds (33 kg) while the separate power supply adds another 57 to 61 pounds. The Super-Pro was first offered in two basic models, with and without a crystal filter.

=== SP-400 ===
SP-400 Super Pro

The SP-400 Super Pros were very similar to the SP-200's with the differences being mainly cosmetic. They were only made from 1946 to 1948 and had outboard power supplies like the earlier Super Pros. There were two of them, the SP-400-X which tuned from .54 to 30 MHz, and the SP-400-SX which tuned from 1.25 to 40 MHz.

=== SP-600 ===
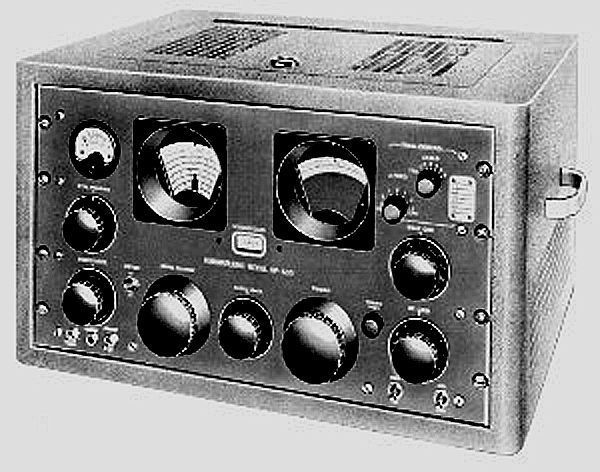
SP-600 Super Pro

The SP-600 Super Pro covered the frequency range of 540 kHz to 54 MHz.

- SP-600-J omitted optional crystal control of selected frequencies.
- SP-600-JLX-2,15 and 23 covered .1–.4, 1.35–29.7 MHz.
- SP-600-JX-17, 30 were for diversity reception use.
- SP-600-VLF-31, 38 was limited to 10–540 kHz.
- SP-600-JX-21A had 22 tubes and featured SSB reception.
- SP-600-JLX-27 covered 0.2–0.4 and 0.54–29.7 MHz.
- SP-600-JX-28 was R-620.
- SP-600-JX-6 was R-274B.
- SP-600-JX-12 was R-274A.
- SP-600-JX-29 was produced for the CIA.
- SP-600-JX-39 was produced for the FAA.

== See also ==
- ARC-5
- BC-348
- BC-611
- ART 13 transmitter
- Collins Radio
- Hammarlund
- National HRO
- R-390A
- Vintage amateur radio
- Wireless Set No. 19

== General references ==
- War Department Technical Manual TM11-866, 31 August 1943 Radio Receivers BC-779-B, BC-794-B, and BC-1004-C and Power Supply Units RA-74-C, RA-84-B, and RA-94-A
- Instruction Book for "Super-Pro" Radio Receiver (100-400 kc and 2.5-20 Mc), overprinted Radio Receiver BC-779-A and Power Supply Unit RA-84-A, Undated, Published by Authority of The Chief Signal Officer, Order No. 21109
- Series 200 Super-Pro by Hammarlund, undated.
- Communications Receivers, The Vacuum Tube Era 1932-1981, 3rd Edition, by Raymond S. Moore
