= Communications receiver =

Type of radio receiver

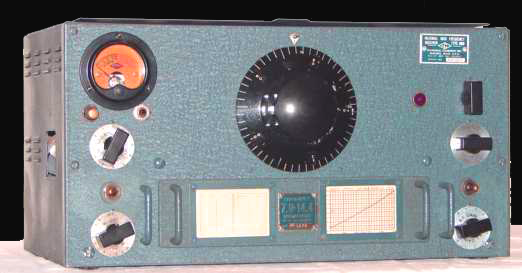
The National HRO, a classic communications receiver c. 1936.

A communications receiver is a type of radio receiver used as a component of a radio communication link. This is in contrast to a broadcast receiver which is used to receive radio broadcasts. A communication receiver receives parts of the radio spectrum not used for broadcasting, including amateur, military, aircraft, marine, and other bands. They are often used with a radio transmitter as part of a two-way radio link for shortwave radio or amateur radio communication, although they are also used for shortwave listening.

== Features ==
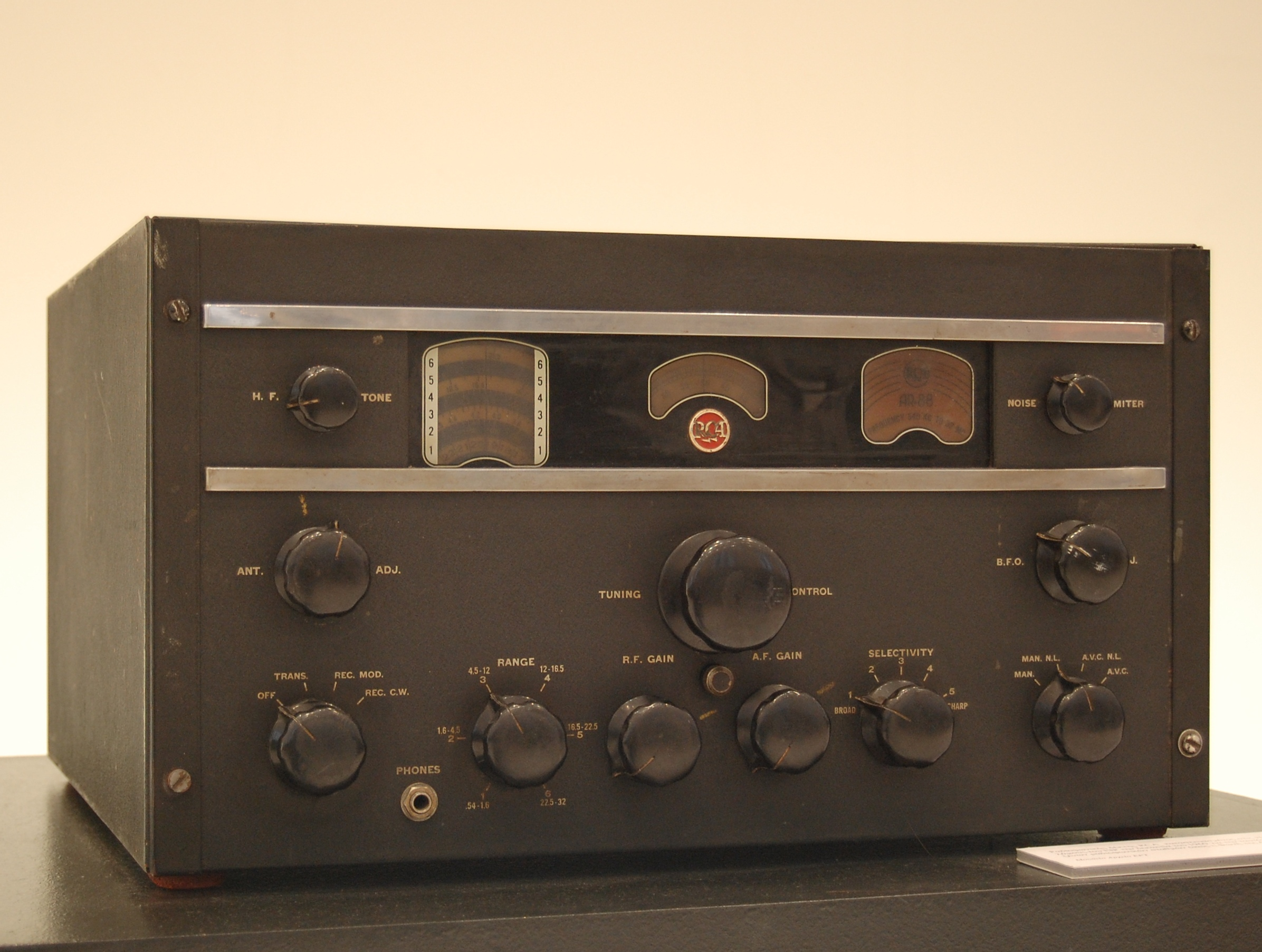
RCA AR-88

Commercial communications receivers are characterized by high stability and reliability of performance, and are generally adapted for remote control and monitoring. For marketing purposes, many hobby-type receivers are advertised as "communications receivers" although none are suited for heavy-duty, reliable 24-hour use as the primary form of communication for an isolated station.

Typically, a communications receiver is of the superheterodyne type in double, triple or, more rarely, quad conversion. It features multiple RF and IF amplification stages and may have at least one IF stage that is crystal controlled. It usually has a BFO and a product detector for SSB and CW reception. The frequency coverage of receivers of this type is typically in the range of 500 kHz to 30 MHz. Communication receivers are suited for operation near powerful transmitting facilities and so must have good internal shielding, and effective front-end filtering. They have design features to provide high selectivity and stability. Rejection of unwanted signals (images, intermodulation products) will typically be much greater than a consumer-type general coverage or broadcast receiver.

The front panel controls are typically more comprehensive than those on a broadcasting receiver. Usual features include: signal strength meter; RF gain control; AVC/AGC adjustments; band switching or preselector switching; selectable bandwidth filters or a Q multiplier; BFO tuning; and audio limiters or attenuators. Precise, calibrated, analog tuning and display dials are used, with a separate bandspread control to allow selective tuning of signals close in frequency. In more recent units, electronic digital frequency displays are provided. In communication receivers, the decorative wooden cabinets typical of early broadcast receivers were replaced with utilitarian metal cabinets to provide electromagnetic shielding and mechanical ruggedness.

Communications receivers as an identifiable product type originated in 1933. The older generation of tube-based communications receivers are affectionately known as boat anchors for their large size and weight. Such receivers include the Collins R-390 and R-390A, the RCA AR-88, the Racal RA-17L and the Marconi Electra. However, even modern solid-state receivers can be very large and heavy, such as the Plessey PR2250, the Redifon R551 or the Rohde & Schwarz EK070/D2-80.

== See also ==
- Amateur radio
- Clandestine radio
- List of communications receivers
- Scanner
- Shortwave radio receiver
- Shortwave listening
- Shortwave radio
- Wadley Loop
