= Bandspread =

Tuning feature of some radio receivers

In a radio receiver, a bandspread control is a secondary tuning control that allows accurate tuning of closely spaced frequencies of a radio band. With a main tuning control that covered a wide range of frequencies, for example 10–14 megahertz in a few turns of the tuning knob, a very small motion might change the tuning by tens of kilohertz and would make accurate tuning to any particular frequency difficult. A calibrated bandspread tuning control allows the main tuning to be set to a predefined spot on the control, and the bandspread allows tuning of a particular frequency within some restricted range of the main tuning control.

One method of adding a bandspread control was to put a relatively small value variable tuning capacitor and dial directly in parallel with the main tuning variable capacitor (or connected to a tap on the coil of the tuned circuit). The smaller capacitor would have much less effect on the resonant frequency than the main capacitor, allowing fine discrimination of the tuned frequency. A second method, mechanical bandspread, was a second tuning knob connected through a gear train to the main tuning knob; each turn of the bandspread dial moved the main dial through a small part of its range, improving the precision of tuning.

Bandspread controls were found on communications receivers, amateur radio receivers, and some broadcast receivers. With the advent of digital frequency synthesizers that could be set with high resolution by a keypad or incremental tuning knob, the requirement for bandspread control in many applications was eliminated.

In the mid-1960s, some British portable radios had a separate 'Bandspread' waveband covering the highest frequencies of the medium wave (AM) band (typically 1400–1600 kHz) to simplify tuning of popular commercial stations such as the offshore Radio Caroline and the continental Radio Luxembourg. A single tuning knob was used for all wavebands.
