= USS Mizpah =

United States Navy patrol yacht

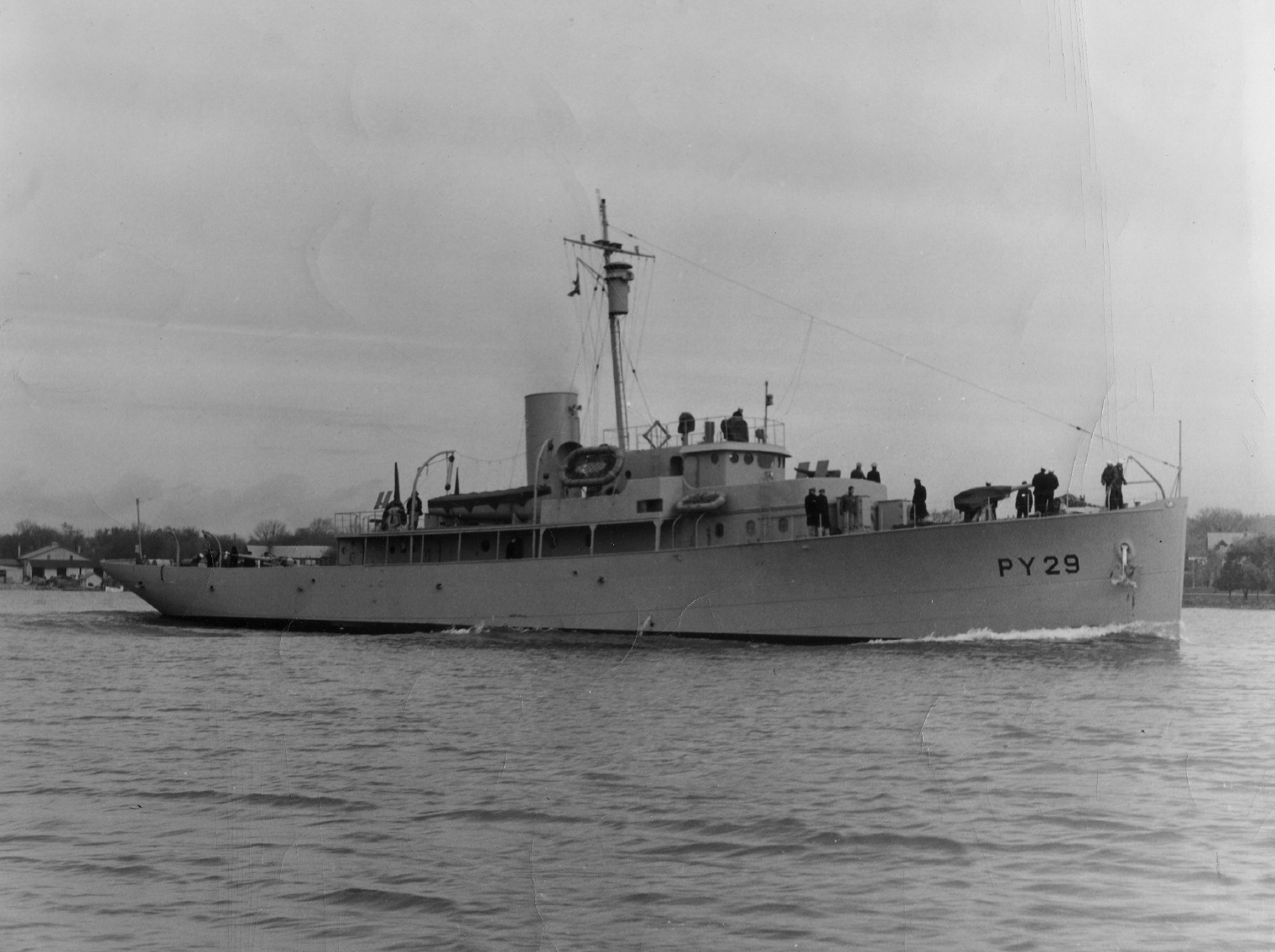
- USS Mizpah on its trial run

History

United States
- Name: Mizpah
- Builder: Newport News Shipbuilding and Drydock Company
- Laid down: 1926
- Commissioned: 26 October 1942
- Decommissioned: 16 January 1946
- Fate: Scuttled, 9 April 1968
- Notes: Call sign: Nan/Baker/Roger/Tare

General characteristics
- Class & type: Patrol yacht
- Displacement: 607 tons
- Length: 181 ft (55 m)
- Beam: 27 ft (8.2 m)
- Draft: 10 ft 7 in (3.23 m)
- Propulsion: Two 850 hp (630 kW) Winton diesel engines, two shafts
- Speed: 13.9 knots (25.7 km/h; 16.0 mph)
- Armament: 2 × 3"/50 caliber dual purpose guns; 3 × .50 caliber machine guns; 2 × depth charge tracks; 2 × depth charge projectors

USS Mizpah (PY-29) was a United States Navy patrol yacht. Constructed in 1926, the vessel was constructed as the pleasure yacht Savarona. In 1929 it was renamed Allegro and then Mizpah for use on the Great Lakes. The vessel was acquired by the United States Navy in 1942 and converted to a warship and commissioned the same year. Mizpah served as a convoy escort along the United States East Coast before becoming a school ship in 1944. Following the end of the war, the vessel returned to private operation in 1946 until 1967 when Mizpah was laid up with a broken crankshaft at Tampa, Florida. An attempt to save the ship proved futile and Mizpah was scuttled off the coast of Florida as an artificial reef in 1968. The wreck is now a popular dive site.

== Service history ==
The 185-foot (56 m) ship was berthed in 1926 from the parts of an abandoned new destroyer, as the pleasure yacht Savanarola by the Newport News Shipbuilding and Drydock Company of Newport News, Virginia. The yacht, originally constructed for the United States Navy but due to naval treaties was prevented from being completed. The still unbuilt vessel was sold to Mrs. Cadwalader of Philadelphia, Pennsylvania. After completion the vessel was given the name Sequoia before being sold to James Elverson who renamed it Allegro. In 1929 it was sold to Eugene F. McDonald of Philadelphia, Pennsylvania, founder and president of the Zenith Radio Corporation, who used it both as a Chicago residence and a floating laboratory on which to test his electronics company's new products. One of the largest yachts on the Great Lakes in its Jazz Age heyday, the ship was renamed Mizpah in 1929.

=== United States Navy service ===
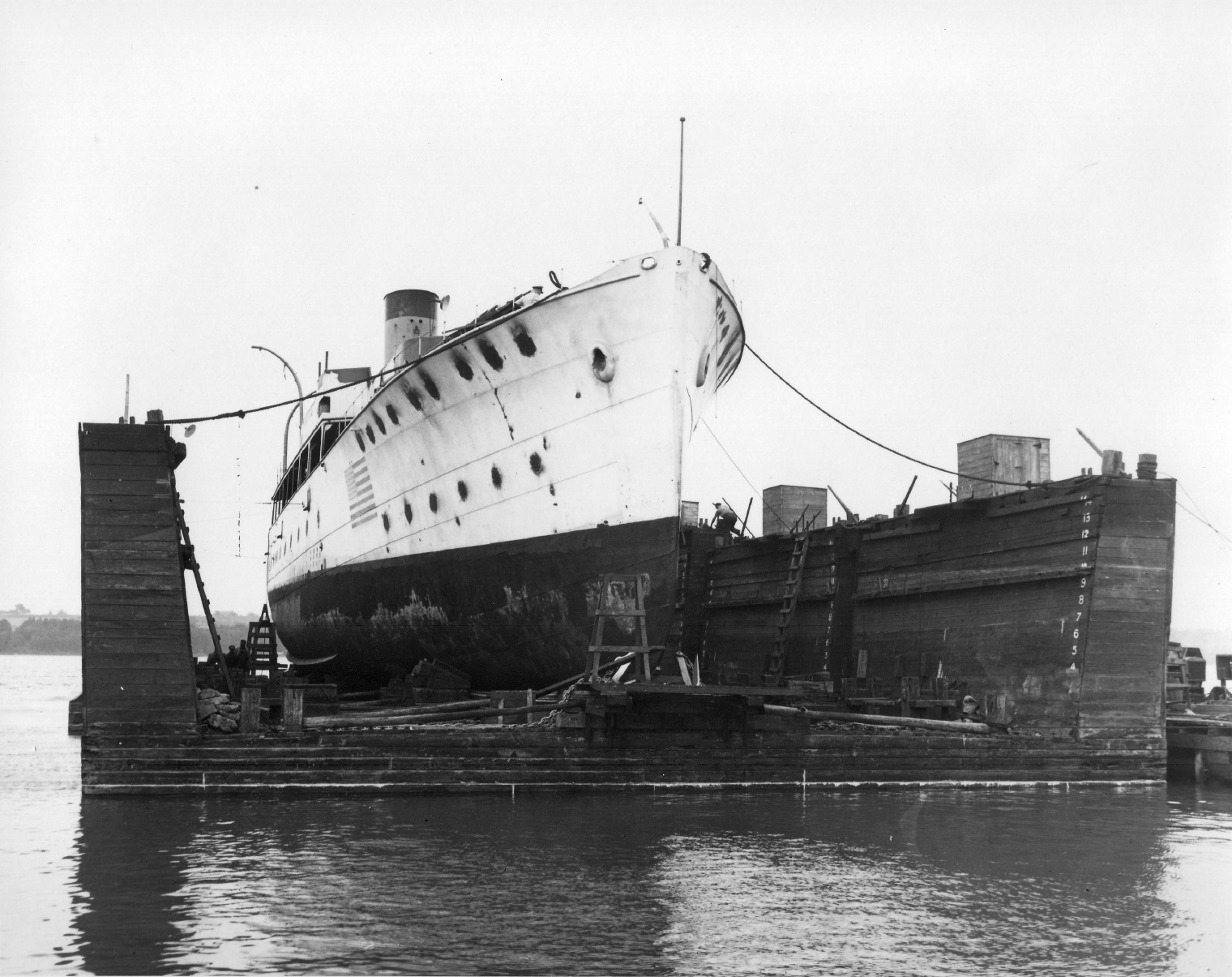
USS Mizpah in drydock, undergoing conversion

Mizpah was acquired by the United States Navy on 16 March 1942 and converted to a warship at Sturgeon Bay Shipbuilding Company, Sturgeon Bay, Wisconsin, with Lieutenant Stephen M. Etnier in command. It was commissioned USS Mizpah (PY-29) on 26 October 1942. Mizpah departed Sturgeon Bay on 16 November 1942 for service as a convoy escort along the eastern coast of the United States between New York City and Key West, Florida until July 1944. From August 1944 until April 1945, Mizpah served as a navigation school ship from the Amphibious Training Base at Little Creek, Virginia, training officers to sail amphibious vessels in the Chesapeake Bay region.

Mizpah underwent conversion to a flagship at Boston, Massachusetts and was employed as such by Destroyer Force, Atlantic Fleet. Mizpah became the flagship of Rear Admiral Oliver M. Hustvedt at Portland, Maine, on 28 May 1945 under the command of Lt. Stephen M. Etnier. Hustvedt was succeeded by Rear Admiral Frank E. Beatty, Jr., on 4 September 1945. In mid-October, 1945, Lt. Etnier was succeeded by Lieutenant D. Dudley Bloom, who sailed Mizpah from Portland, Maine, south to Charleston, South Carolina, arriving on 10 December 1945. She was decommissioned on 16 January 1946 and transferred to the United States War Shipping Administration (WSA) on 25 September 1946 for disposal.

=== Final years ===
The WSA then sold her to a private Honduran corporation for transporting bananas out of South America. While sailing to Tampa, Florida, the vessel was caught in a storm, suffered a broken crankshaft, and was laid up in Tampa for repair. At that time, Eugene Kinney, McDonald's nephew and Zenith Corporation vice president who had grown up on Mizpah and served as a naval officer in the South Pacific during World War II, learned of her plight and purchased her. Finding Mizpah irreparably damaged, however, Kinney scuttled her off the coast of Palm Beach, Florida, on 9 April 1968, along with another ship, USS PC-1174, to serve as an artificial reef to prevent beach erosion.

Sitting in 90–110 feet (27–34 m) of water with her hatches left ajar, Mizpah is now one of the chief attractions of an offshore scuba diving area known as "The Mizpah Corridor".

== Sources ==
- "Mizpah". Dictionary of American Naval Fighting Ships. Navy Department, Naval History and Heritage Command.
