= Robert Davol Budlong =

American industrial designer

Robert Davol Budlong (1902–1955) was an American industrial designer from Denver, Colorado.

He studied art at Cummings School of Art in Des Moines, Iowa and graduated from Grinnell College, Iowa in 1921. This was followed by further study at the Chicago Academy of Fine Arts.

He started his design career in 1933, with the Hammond Clock Company and, in 1934–1935, became a design consultant with Zenith Radio. This involvement with Zenith was to last until his death.

In 1938-39, Budlong designed a modern electrified piano for a collaboration between Story and Clark pianos and electronics giant RCA. The resulting "Storytone piano" was the first commercial electric piano, using a magnetic pickup and amplifier/speaker to give the piano volume (much like an electric guitar uses electronics rather than acoustic projection.) The stylish and modern Budlong design was a hit at the 1939 NY World's Fair at Flushing Meadows, and has since become considered one of the most-beautiful pianos ever designed.

He designed many of Zenith's pre-war portable radios, and virtually their entire "Trans-Oceanic" line. His other radio designs included a "universal portable" AC/DC radio with batteries (1940), the "Poket" radio in 1941, and the "Transoceanic Clipper" in 1942. Although Zenith wanted him to work full-time as an employee, and head an in-house industrial design group, Budlong wished to remain independent to retain other clients. However, he did relocate his offices to the Zenith building on 333 Michigan Avenue, Chicago, that housed Zenith's corporate showrooms.

His other major clients included Sunbeam, Sears-Roebuck, and Victor Cash Register. For Sunbeam, he designed the T-20 Toaster in 1950 - a newer type of appliance that lowered bread automatically, and raised itself silently when done - and worked with Sunbeam staff designer Ivar Jepson on the "Shavemaster" (1950) electric shaver. This model had a smooth, rounded head and an ergonomic shape to be held in the palm of the hand, rather than the previous elongated shape held like a hammer.

Budlong's business was taken over after his death in 1955 by one of his associates, Ken Schory Sr. and renamed Ken Schory Associates.
