= United States Post Office (Spring Valley, New York) =

- U.S. Post Office
- U.S. National Register of Historic Places
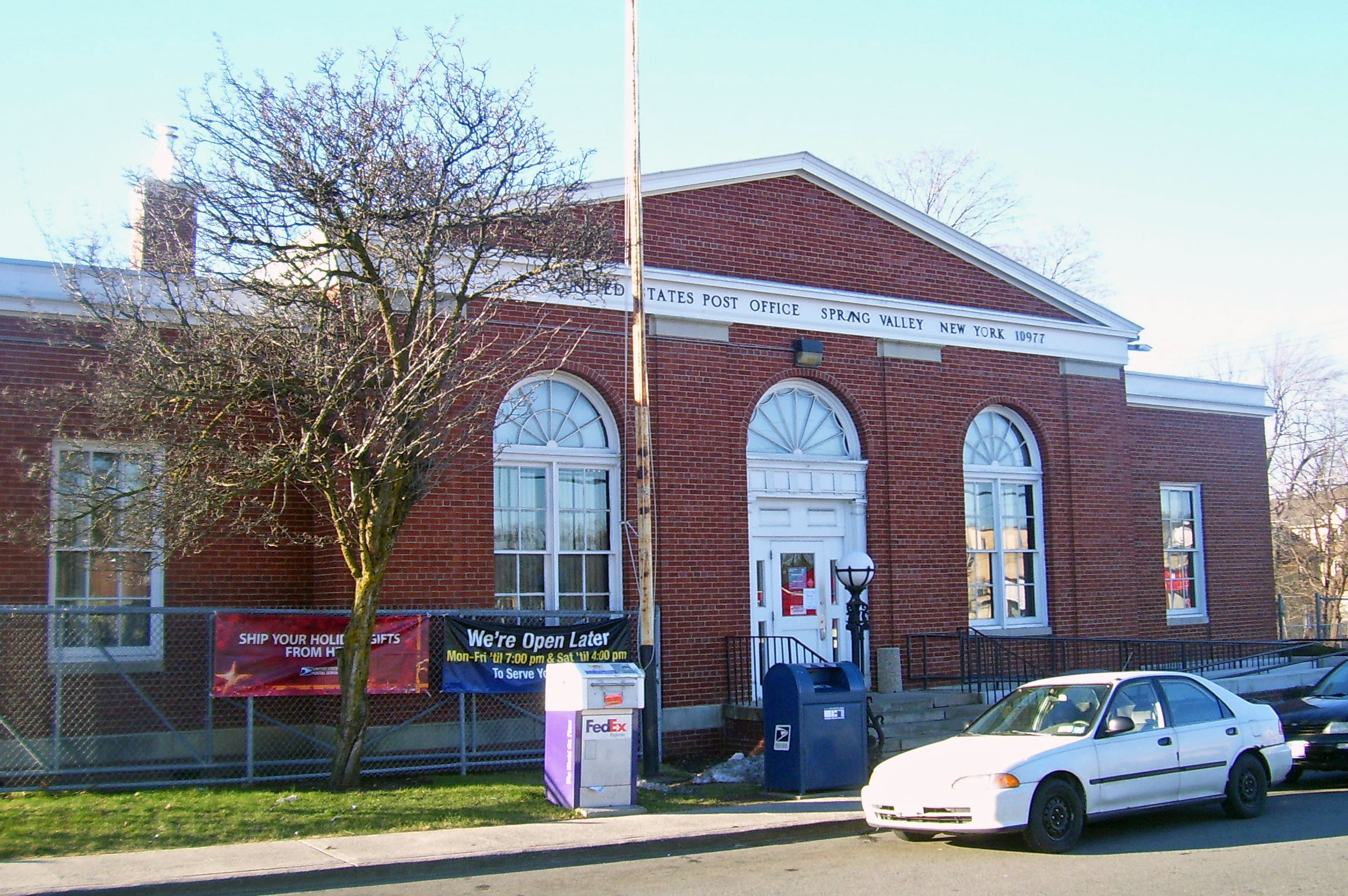
- East elevation, 2008

- Location within New York Location within the United States
- Location: Spring Valley, NY
- Nearest city: Hackensack, NJ
- Coordinates: 41°6′46″N 74°2′44″W
- Area: less than one acre
- Built: 1936
- Architect: Simon, Louis A.; Etnier, Stephen
- Architectural style: Colonial Revival
- MPS: US Post Offices in New York State, 1858-1943, TR
- NRHP reference No.: 88002432
- Added to NRHP: May 11, 1989

The U.S. Post Office in Spring Valley, New York, is located on North Madison Street. It is a brick building from the mid-1930s that serves the ZIP Code 10977, covering the village of Spring Valley.

Its Colonial Revival design, unique to Spring Valley among post offices in New York, emphasizes the Greek Revival precedents of the style. Its interior, like many other post offices built during the New Deal, features public art, in this case a mural. In 1989 it was listed on the National Register of Historic Places along with many other post offices in the state.

== Building ==
The post office is located on the west side of North Madison Avenue between Church and Commerce streets, one block west of North Main Street (New York State Route 45) in downtown Spring Valley. The area is heavily developed, with many parking lots and commercial buildings. A few churches and houses are scattered among them. The terrain slopes slightly down to the east, into the valley of a small tributary of Pascack Brook.

A row of mature trees rises along the rear of the property. To the south is the post office's parking lot, complementing a municipal lot across the street. The small lot on the Church Street corner is undeveloped and open. To the rear is a tire dealership.

The building itself has two sections. The main block is a one-story five-by-five-bay steel frame structure on a low stone foundation with water table. It is faced in red brick laid in common bond. The central three bays are topped with a shallow-pitched gabled roof. A covered loading dock extends west from the southwest corner of that side.

On the eastern (front) facade, the three bays under the gable form a slightly projecting pavilion. The main entrance is located in a slightly recessed round-arched entryway. Flanking it are similarly-shaped windows, consisting of paired four-over-four double-hung sash topped by a transom with radiating sash. Four brick pilasters with simple stone capitals divide the bays and mark the corners. They support a wooden frieze, with "United States Post Office Spring Valley New York 10977" spelled in affixed metal letters, below the pediment.

The two wings have flat roofs pierced by brick chimneys topped with steel air handlers. On the front they have one six-over-six window. The west (rear) facade echoes the front with three large sash windows.

Stone steps on a brick base, flanked by a wheelchair ramp on the north, lead up to the main entrance. They are accompanied by the original wrought iron railings and one original lamppost, slightly modified. The main entrance is surrounded by elaborate wooden decoration, with flanking half-pilasters and sidelights rising past a recessed paneled frieze to an entablature with triglyphs. A semicircular transom with radiating muntins, slightly different from those on the flanking windows, surmounts the entrance.

Modern aluminum doors open into a wooden vestibule at the center of one arm of an L-shaped lobby covering all but the northern bay of the front. That arm is floored in terrazzo, with the south arm in vinyl. A gray marble dado runs around the wall, and pilasters mark the corners. A molded cornice on the wall marks the plaster ceiling where modern fluorescent lights have replaced the original fixtures. There is also an original wooden cornice over the teller windows, which have been widened and surrounded with blue Formica.

Above the door to the postmaster's office in the northeastern corner of the building is a mural, Waiting for the Mail, by Stephen Etnier. Its three panels depict the wing of an airplane, a man waiting against a fence, and the bow of a ship. It was restored in the mid-1980s.

== History ==
Spring Valley's first post office was established in 1848, seven years after local farmers persuaded the New York and Erie Railroad to build a stop where a farm road (now North Main Street) crossed the tracks. The settlement grew rapidly due to the rail connection to New York City and incorporated as a village in 1902.

In 1931, Congress authorized 136 new post offices and extensions to existing ones in New York as part of an amendment to the Public Buildings Act it had passed five years earlier. The construction was meant to offer relief with the worsening of the Great Depression. Spring Valley's would not begin construction for another five years, in 1936. The site was purchased from a local lumber company that year. Construction began later that year, and the building opened in 1937.

Its Colonial Revival design, by Treasury Department Supervising Architect Louis A. Simon, is unique to Spring Valley among the many Colonial Revival post offices in the state, many of which use variations on a basic design. Other post offices in the state, such as Fredonia, Massena and Warsaw, use a projecting three-bay central pavilion with arched windows flanked by single-bay flat-roofed wings. Only Spring Valley's emphasizes the Greek Revival precedents of the style with the pilasters and pediment. Another architect, Jackson Flournoy, used them on his post office in the Queens neighborhood of Jackson Heights, also listed on the Register.

Etnier's mural, meant to show how mail could and did reach even the most isolated people and linked the world, was added in 1938. Later renovations enlarged the lobby teller windows and added modern lighting. There have been no other significant changes to the building.

== See also ==
- National Register of Historic Places listings in Rockland County, New York
