= Marianne McDonald =

American philanthropist and scholar (born 1937)

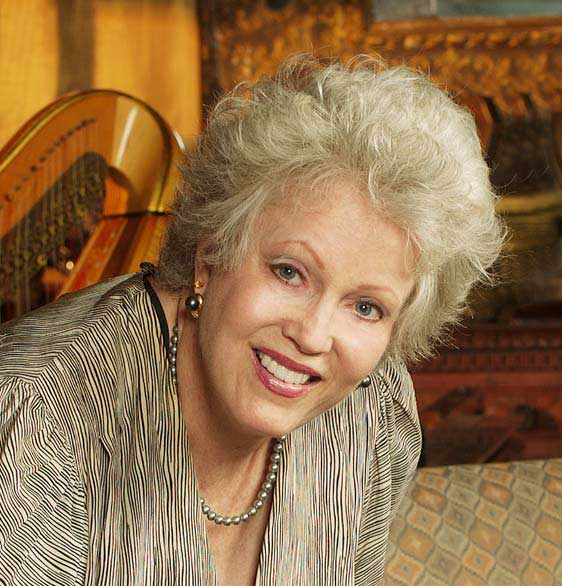
- Dr. Marianne McDonald
- Born: January 2, 1937; Chicago
- Education: University of Chicago
- Occupations: scholar and philanthropist
- Parent: Eugene F. McDonald

Marianne McDonald (born January 2, 1937) is a scholar and philanthropist. She is involved in the interpretation, sharing, compilation, and preservation of Greek and Irish texts, plays and writings. Recognized as a historian on the classics, she has received numerous awards and accolades because of her works and philanthropy. As a playwright, she has authored numerous modern works, based on ancient Greek dramas in modern times. In 2013, she was awarded the Distinguished Professor of Theatre and Classics, Department of Theatre, Classics Program, University of California, San Diego (joint program with UC Irvine). In 1994, she was inducted into the Royal Irish Academy, being recognized for her expertise and academic excellence in Irish language history, interpretation and the preservation of ancient Irish texts. As a philanthropist, she partnered with Sharp to enhance access to drug and alcohol treatment programs by making a $3 million pledge—the largest gift to benefit behavioral health services in Sharp's history. Her donation led to the creation of the McDonald Center at Sharp HealthCare. Additionally, to recognize her generosity, Sharp Vista Pacifica Hospital was renamed Sharp McDonald Center.

== Early life ==
McDonald was born on January 2, 1937, in Chicago. She went to school at the Convent of the Sacred Heart there and finished her secondary education at the Chicago Latin School. It was in these years that she gained a love for Latin, Greek, and the classics. In 1958, she graduated magna cum laude from Bryn Mawr College with a Bachelor of Arts degree in the classics and music. In 1960, she continued her education by getting a master's degree from the University of Chicago and by earning a doctorate in 1975 from the University of California, Irvine.

She credits her love for learning from her father, Eugene Francis McDonald. He grew up in New York City and became the head of the family at age twelve when he had to drop out of school in order to support his family. After having gone deaf, he invented the Zenith hearing aid and created the Zenith Radio Corporation. When he died in 1958, he left Marianne a large fortune and a collection of gifts that furthered her interest in Ireland and the desire to give generously.

== Career ==
McDonald has been teaching for the majority of her life. She has taught primarily at University of California, Irvine, and University of California, San Diego, as a professor of Classics and Theater. She has also been a visiting professor of classics at Trinity College, Dublin, University College Dublin, University College Cork, Dublin City University, and the University of Ulster in Coleraine. She has published over 250 books, translations, plays, and poems and she has written even more articles. She has performed in a large number of Greek plays.

Two of McDonald's projects are the Thesaurus Linguae Graecae (TLG) and the Thesaurus Linguae Hiberniae. The TLG is a computerized compilation of Greek literature that McDonald founded and funded at the University of California, Irvine. Years later, she did the same thing in Ireland by founding the Thesaurus Linguae Hibernicae which computerizes Irish literature.

In her adult life, McDonald has reached an impressive number of achievements and has received numerous awards because of her works. McDonald has been awarded honorary doctorates from the National University of Ireland, University College Dublin, the American College of Greece, the University of Athens, and the University of Thessalonika. In 1994, she was inducted into the Royal Irish Academy for her ongoing efforts to preserve and translate ancient Irish texts. That same year, she was made a commander of the Order of the Phoenix, one of Greece's highest awards, by Prime Minister Andreas Papandreou for her contributions to Greek drama. In 1999, McDonald was awarded the Ellis Island Medal of Honor for distinguished achievements as an American. McDonald has also been given Irish citizenship on the basis of all that she has done for Ireland. In 2008, she was inducted into the San Diego Women's Hall of Fame. Her 2005 play "... and then he met a woodcutter" won the San Diego Critics Circle Craig Craig Noel Award for Outstanding New Play.

As a pioneer in the field of modern versions of the classics, in films, plays, and opera, McDonald has published much work on the subjects. With about 250 publications, in addition to her articles and book chapters, her published books include: Euripides in Cinema: The Heart Made Visible (Centrum Press, 1983), Ancient Sun, Modern Light: Greek Drama on the Modern Stage (Columbia University Press, 1992); Sing Sorrow: Classics, History and Heroines in Opera (Greenwood, 2001); and The Living Art of Greek Tragedy (Indiana University Press, 2003); with J. Michael Walton: Amid Our Troubles: Irish Versions of Greek Tragedies (Methuen, 2002); and The Cambridge Companion to Greek and Roman Theatre (2007). Her performed translations (three a year since 1999 nationally and internationally with many published) include: Sophocles's Antigone, dir. Athol Fugard in Ireland (1999); Trojan Women (2000 and 2009); Euripides's Children of Heracles (2003); Sophocles's Oedipus Tyrannus and Oedipus at Colonus (2003–4); Euripides's Hecuba, 2005, Sophocles's Ajax, 2006, Euripides's Iphigenia at Aulis and Bacchae, 2006; and 2007 and 2009; Euripides's Phoenician Women, (2009); Medea (2007); Seneca's Thyestes (2008) and with J. Michael Walton Aeschylus's Oresteia and Aristophanes's Frogs (2007); Helen (2008); versions and other works : The Trojan Women (2000); Medea, Queen of Colchester (2003), The Ally Way (2004); ... and then he met a woodcutter (San Diego Critics’ Circle: Best New Play of 2005), Medea: The Beginning, performed with Athol Fugard’s Jason: The End (2006); The Last Class (2007); Fires in Heaven (2009), and A Taste for Blood (2010).

== Selected publications ==
- Terms for Happiness in Euripides. Hypomnemata, Vol. 54 (Vandenhoeck & Ruprecht, 1978); Greek Translation by Errikos Belies (1991).
- Euripides in Cinema: The Heart Made Visible (Philadelphia: Centrum, 1983); Greek translation by Errikos Belies (Athens: Estia, 1989; rpt. Boston: The Greek Institute, 1991); Italian translation: Sole Antico, Luce Moderna, trans. of Ancient Sun, 1999), with an expanded introduction, epilogue and additional chapter, Dioniso Nero: la tragedia greca dell'Africa ("Black Dionysus: Greek Tragedy in Africa").
- Ancient Sun, Modern Light: Greek Drama on the Modern Stage. (Columbia University Press, 1992); Greek Translation by Paulos Matesis, (1993).
- Mythology of the Zodiac: Tales of the Constellations (MetroBooks, 2000); Sophia Souliotis, trans. (Periplous, 2002). Published in England as Star Myths: Tales of the Constellations (Michael Friedman Publishing Group, June 5, 1996); Published in America as Tales of the Constellations: The Myths and Legends of the Night Sky. (Michael Friedman Publishing Group),
- Sole Antico, Luce Moderna, Translation of Ancient Sun, Modern Light by Francesca Albini (Levante, 1999), with an expanded introduction, epilogue and additional chapter, Dioniso Nero: la tragedia greca dell'Africa ("Black Dionysus: Greek Tragedy in Africa").
- Antigone by Sophocles, Translation with Introduction, (Nick Hern Books, 2000).
- Sing Sorrow: Classics, History and Heroines in Opera (Greenwood Publishing Group, 2001).
- Andromache by Euripides, Translation with Introduction, with J. Michael Walton (Nick Hern Books, 2001).
- Euripides’ Trojan Women in Six Greek Tragedies: Aeschylus: Persians, Prometheus Bound; Sophocles Women of Trachis, Philoctetes; Euripides Trojan Women, Bacchae, Translation, Introduction and Edited, with Michael Walton (Methuen Publishing, 2002).
- Amid Our Troubles: Irish Versions of Greek Tragedy, Edited with Michael Walton (Methuen Publishing, 2002).
- The Living Art of Greek Tragedy (Indiana University Press, 2003).
- Fragments: Poems (Quantum 2, 2003).
- …and then he met a woodcutter, Illustrations by Jasmine de Lung (Quantum 2, 2003).
- Electra, by Euripides, Translation with Introduction with Michael Walton (Nick Hern Books, 2004).
- Electra, by Sophocles, Translation with Introduction with Michael Walton (Nick Hern Books, 2004).
- Euripides’ Hecuba, Translation with Introduction (Nick Hern Books, 2005).
- Aeschylus: The Oresteia, Translation with Introduction with J. Michael Walton (Nick Hern Books, 2007).
- The Cambridge Companion to Greek and Roman Theatre, Edited with J. Michael Walton, including introduction and chapter, (Cambridge University Press, 2007)
- Sophocles Made New: Modern Performance Prof. Marianne McDonald, University of California, San Diego, in Brill's Companion to Sophocles, Andreas Markantonatos, ed. (Leiden: Brill Publishers, 2012).
- The Craft of Athol Fugard: Space, Time, and Silence (Murasaki books, 2012).
- Medea, Queen of Colchester in Black Medea: Adaptations in Modern Plays, ed. Kevin Wetmore Jr. Amherst, New York: Cambria Press (Global Performing Arts Series, General Editor: John M. Clum), 2013.
- Croaks into Song: Sondheim Tackles Greek Frogs book chapter in Oxford Handbook of Sondheim Studies, ed. Robert Gold (Oxford: Oxford University Press, 2014).
- Dancing Drama: Ancient Greek Theatre in Modern Shoes and Shows book chapter for Oxford Handbook on Dance and Theatre, edited by Nadine George (Oxford: Oxford University Press, 2015).
