= Eugene F. McDonald =

American radio and electronics manufacturer (1886–1958)

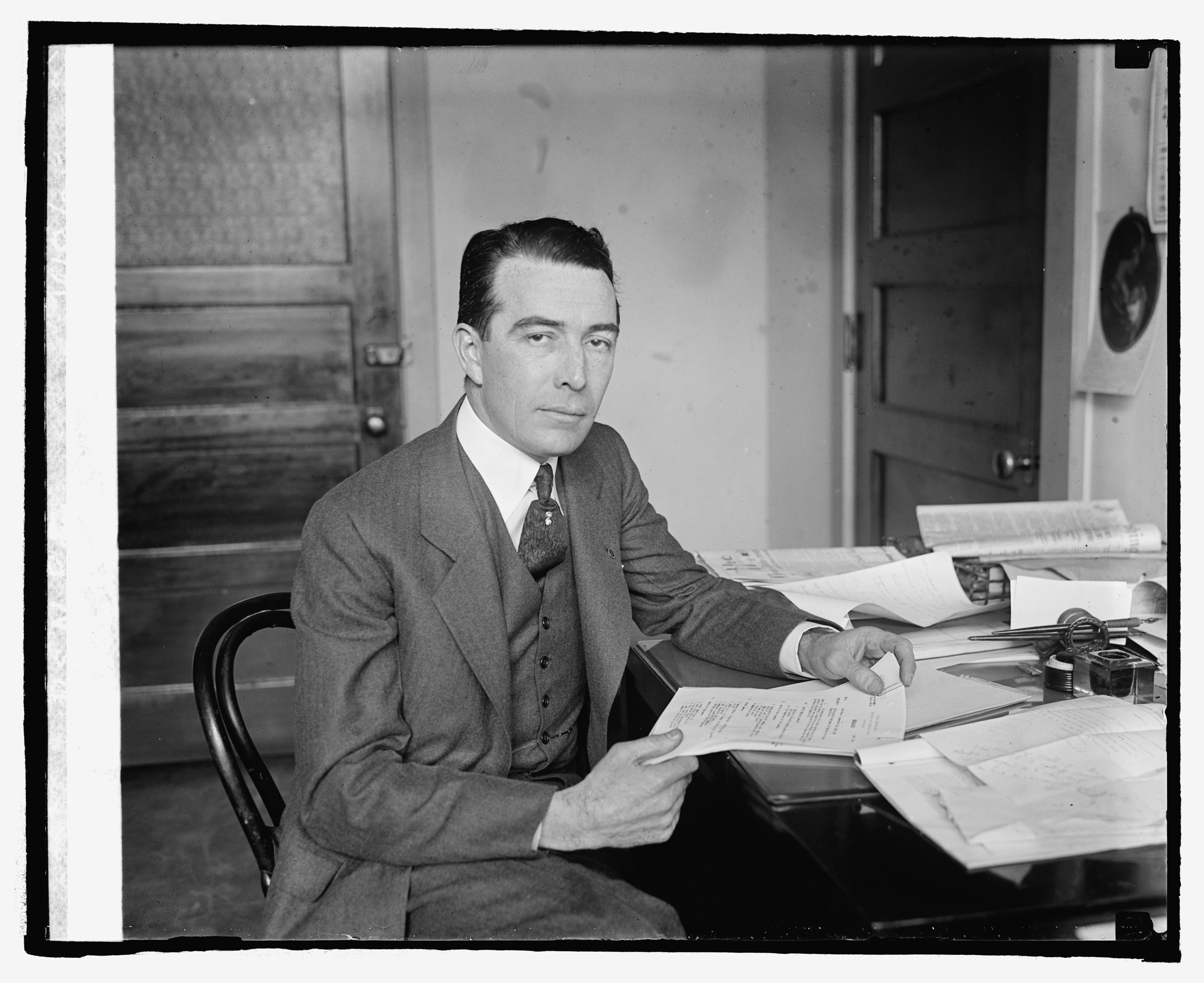
- Eugene F. McDonald Jr (nicknamed "The Commander")
- Born: March 11, 1886; Syracuse, New York
- Died: May 15, 1958 (aged 72); Chicago, Illinois
- Other name: The Commander
- Occupations: Founder and CEO of Zenith Radio Corporation
- Known for: Marketed the first portable multiband radio, the first TV remote control, and developer of the worlds first “Pay Per View” television service that made its global debut on May 1, 1950 . Yachtsman, detailed management style, and commitment to quality of Zenith Radio Corporation products.

Eugene F. McDonald (1886–1958) founded Zenith Radio in 1921, a major American radio and electronics manufacturer for most of the twentieth century.

== Early life ==
Eugene F. McDonald Jr. was born March 11, 1886, in Syracuse, New York, the son of Frazier McDonald and Betty May Thompson McDonald. He earned his first money while a schoolboy by reading electric meters. School did not appeal to McDonald, and at the end of his sophomore year in high school he left school to take a factory job with the Franklin Automobile Company.

Moving to Chicago in 1904, he became an automobile salesman with the Franklin Auto Company and, as a publicity stunt, once drove a car up the steps of the General John Logan Memorial in Grant Park—with a photographer present and a policeman there to arrest him. He paid the policeman $10 (equivalent to $358 in 2025) for the arrest. In 1904, he began working for the company in Syracuse. He quickly rose in the sales and promotion areas and made a name for himself. In 1910, he moved back to Chicago to join a speculative business of a friend of his who wished to manufacture an automobile self-starter. The business did not succeed and McDonald lost his investment.

In 1911, he was in partnership in Detroit selling used cars, and by the end of 1912 had begun a credit finance company for the purchase of new and used cars, a commodity that had previously not been available on credit. He was the first to offer working people a payment plan for the purchase of an automobile.

== Military service ==
When the United States entered World War I in 1917, he enlisted in the Naval intelligence service and eventually became a lieutenant commander. His commission came about as he understood the operation a device used in the Navy for recording radio and telephone conversations – the "telegraphone" – and the manufacturer was no longer in business. He remained in the service until 1919 but continued service in the Naval Reserve until 1939. He kept the title of lieutenant commander for the rest of his life, having retired at the rank from the USNR.

== Founding of Zenith Radio Corporation ==
In 1921, Mcdonald entered into a partnership with the founders of the Chicago Radio Laboratory, Karl Hassel, and Ralph Matthews. Under the tradename "Z-nith", this partnership held a valuable Armstron license but lacked funds for expansion to meet the demands of their order book. McDonald was appointed general manager.

In 1923 McDonald, Matthews and Hassel incorporated the Zenith Corporation to continue their business. From the call letters of their amateur station, 9ZN, they developed the trade name of ZN-th.

By 1927, the company was large enough to secure its own RCA manufacturing license.

He formed and was the first president of the National Association of Broadcasters and pioneered the development of the short-wave radio. When Donald B. MacMillan made his Arctic trip he was equipped with transmitters and receivers supplied by the Zenith Corporation. "He expanded the radio medium into international communications, ship-to-shore, radar, and VHF and UHF television." The company slogan was: "The quality goes in before the name goes on."

McDonald was well known for his charismatic leadership style, and his unexpected death in 1958 reportedly "left a void of talent at the top" of the company.

== The Zenith Trans-Oceanic ==
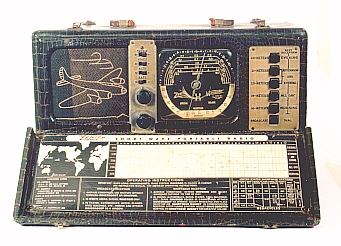
The Zenith 7G605 Trans-Oceanic Clipper 1941-1942

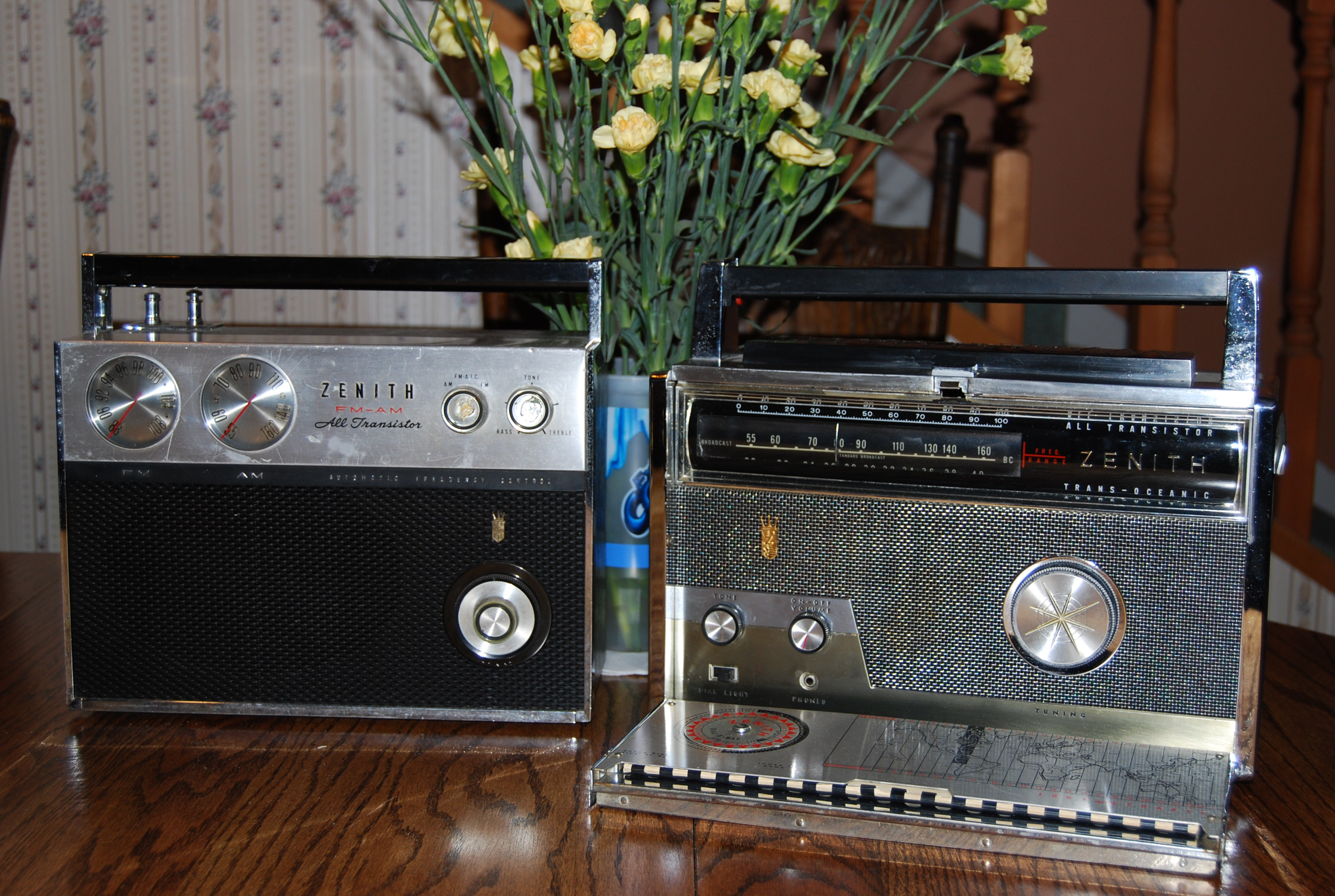
Left: The Royal 2000 Tran-Symphony (1960), first American FM/AM portable. Right: The Royal 1000 Trans-Oceanic (1957), first transistor portable multiband radio.

Eugene McDonald, besides being a hard-driving and demanding CEO, was also a yachtsman. His yacht the Mizpah (later the USS Mizpah (PY-29)) was one of the largest in the Great Lakes region. Toward the end of 1939 the interest in the war in Europe increased. McDonald had poor reception of any regional broadcast aboard the Mizpah and suggested that a portable radio be produced that could receive not only standard broadcast (AM radio) but higher-frequency shortwave broadcast to receive international broadcasts that use radio frequencies that could bounce off the Earth's ionosphere (upper atmosphere) and travel great distances.

One of the big obstacles to such a radio was that vacuum tubes in the 1930s and 1940s had trouble operating at higher frequencies using battery power supplies which were lower voltage than AC-operated designs. In late 1941 after many rejects by McDonald (who personally tested the sets on his yacht). Zenith Radio engineers Gustaffson, Passow, Striker and Emde came up with the model 7G605 "Clipper", that was approved by McDonald. Zenith advertised this new product extensively, including loaning or giving sets to celebrities. Zenith made electronics and radio history by producing the first totally portable multiband radio designed for standard and shortwave broadcast listening. Zenith went into production in 1942, but the US entry into World War II put a production halt to the "Clipper". Although no new consumer Trans-Oceanics were made, Zenith provided them for the war effort and continued to advertise and promote the Trans-Oceanic during World War II. Very few were produced (35,000), and not very many are in service presently, which makes this a very rare item.

In December 1957, Eugene McDonald and Zenith engineers produced the world's first portable transistorized multiband radio, the Royal 1000 Trans-Oceanic. McDonald was again personally involved with conception and manufacturing. The Royal 1000 like the "Clipper" was designed for standard and shortwave broadcast reception. The quality construction and engineering design efforts, a Zenith trademark were mechanically and electronically demonstrated in this model. This was McDonald's last major involvement with Zenith as he died the following year.

The Trans-Oceanic is considered by many the best-designed mass-produced portable radio made. Zenith for the most part, until the end of the model line, used the latest cost-effective technology advances and materials in Trans-Oceanics. The Trans-Oceanic model line ran from 1942 to 1982. For years it was the top selling "high-end" portable multiband radio until it was finally eclipsed by Sony with their digital tuning ICF-2001 and ICF2010 in the 1980s, which put the Trans-Oceanic out of business.

== Zenith introduces the television remote control ==
Zenith radio advertisement for "Lazy Bones" remote control, 1951

RCA's promoting radio manufacturers to build televisions with its no royalty policy got Zenith Radio into the TV business during the end of the 1940s. McDonald, whose aversion to commercials was well-known, wanted Zenith to produce and sell a remote control.

In 1950 Zenith came up with a remote control called the "Lazy Bones" which was connected with wires to the TV set. The next development was the "Flashmatic" (1955), designed by Eugene Polley, a wireless remote control that used a light beam to signal the TV (with a photosensitive pickup device) to change stations. One problem was that during the daytime the sensitivity degraded. In 1956 Zenith began producing a remote control named after McDonald's nickname "The Commander" and calling it the "Space Command". This new technology worked by sending an ultrasonic tone to the TV set, where it was picked up with a miniature microphone sensitive to only that tone. At the cost of $259.95, it was truly a luxury item.

== Family ==
McDonald married the former Inez Riddle but they divorced in 1947. In 1962, four years after the commander's death, his former wife Inez Riddle McDonald Neale sought to have the divorce set aside. The McDonald estate was estimated to be worth $30 million, but there were also lower estimates. Details of the decision were (McDonald v Neale) filed in 1962. It was ruled against claims his former wife petitioned for. The Illinois court ruling can be seen at this link McDonald Jr vs Neale.

There were two children born to the marriage: daughter Jean Marianne and son Eugene McDonald III. The son, known as "Stormy", died from an apparently self-inflicted gunshot wound to the back of the head, on February 6, 1965. His body was brought back to Chicago from Arizona, where a funeral service was conducted. Prior to his death he was briefly married to Virginia Baker.
