= Trans-Oceanic =

Zenith Radio brand of shortwave receivers (1941–1981)

A Trans-Oceanic model Y600. Shown on the left is a modern shortwave radio for comparison.

The Trans-Oceanic (abbreviated T/O) was a brand of portable radios produced from 1941 to 1981 by Zenith Radio. They were characterized by heavy-duty, high-quality construction and their performance as shortwave receivers.

== History ==
Zenith's founder, Lieutenant Commander Eugene F. McDonald, was a great admirer of advancing technology and believed that his company should include the latest, most practical advances in a sturdy product that would enhance the company's reputation. Of the many products of Zenith Radio, the 'Trans-Oceanic' series of portable radios were among the most famous.

McDonald was a keen yachtsman and outdoorsman and wished for a portable radio that would provide entertainment broadcasts as well as being able to tune into weather, marine and international shortwave stations. He asked his company's engineers to develop prototypes to meet his criteria and by 1940 they had concept sets that were ready for production.

The Trans-Oceanic remains popular among collectors and non-collectors alike. A cult-like following has developed around the receivers, with earlier tube or valve versions prized by radio collectors, resulting in the availability of many working models and replacement parts.

=== 7G605/8G005Y series ===
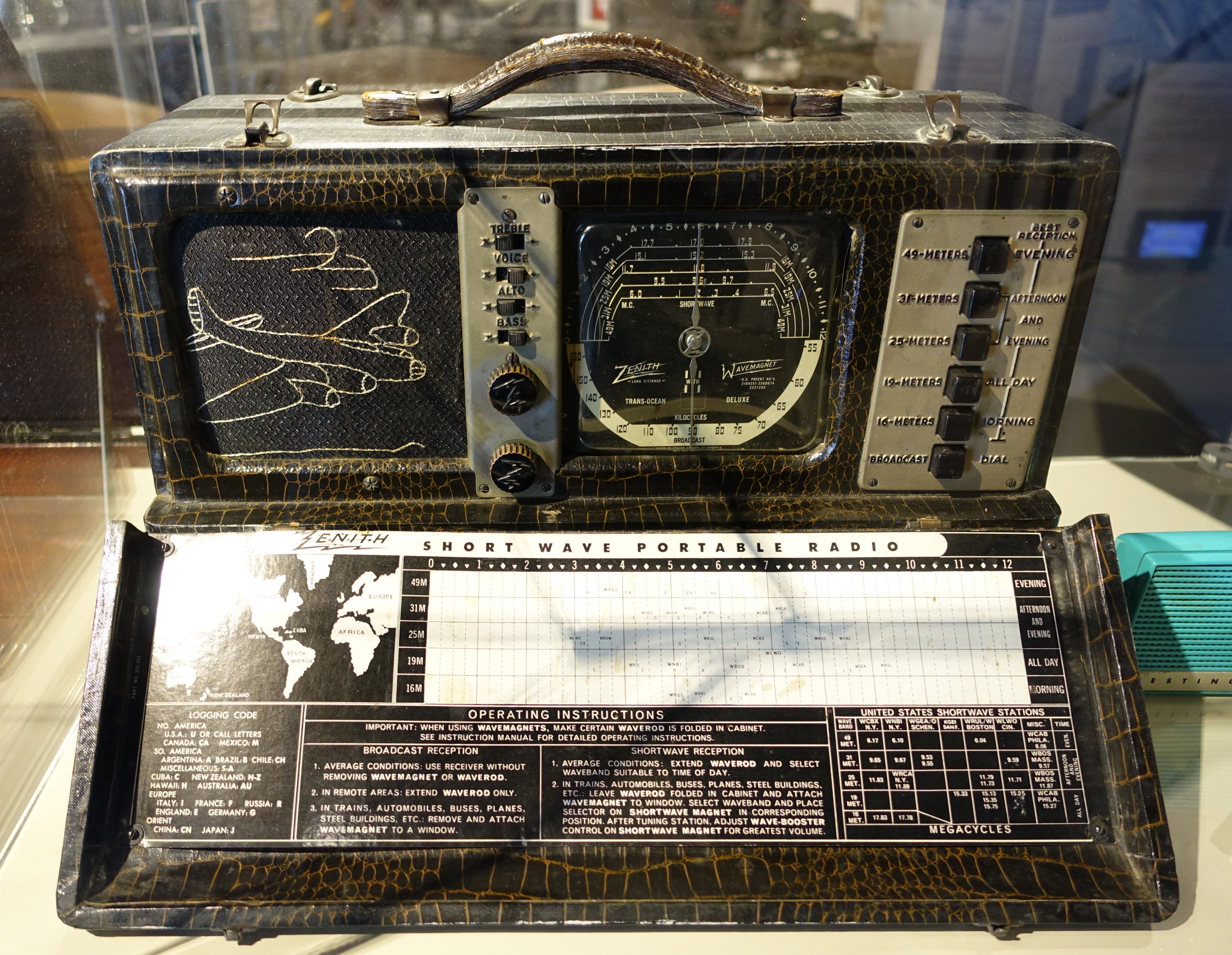
One of the first portable shortwave radio receivers: Zenith Model 7G605 Trans-Oceanic 'Clipper' circa 1942.

The Zenith 'T/O' began life in October 1941 with the production of the Model 7G605 'Trans-ocean Clipper'. Priced at $75, it was introduced in January 1942 but ceased production in April 1942 as Zenith shifted their production to war-related equipment. During this short production run, some 35,000 units were produced and sales data showed that many were sold to customers in the 'above average' income group. However, many also found their way into various theatres of war and in to the hands of appreciative servicemen—demand for a resumption of production at war's end was kept high. The first run of approximately 10,000 units had a sailboat-embroidered speaker grille, but after the Pearl Harbor attack, the patriotic Commander ordered the grille cloth changed to depict a bomber vaguely resembling a Boeing B-17 bomber. The T/O was a dual-powered radio receiver; it could operate from electrical service AC or DC and via a pair of "A" and "B" dry cell batteries for portability. The batteries are obsolete but the early T/O models live on either due to the ability to use AC line or a battery made of modern cells (6 Ds for the "A" power and 10 9 volt transistor batteries for "B") or an inverter. The 7G605 used seven tubes: 117ZG6, 3Q5, 1LE3, 1LN5, 1LA6, 1LN5, and 1LD5. Zenith used a selenium rectifier on later versions of the T/O, replacing rectifier tubes used on the earlier models. Inserting the power plug into a socket on the chassis or the side of the radio (depending on model) switched the T/O to battery operation.

The first post-war T/O was the 8G005Y, designed by Robert Davol Budlong, an industrial design consultant responsible for many of the Zenith radio products. Priced at $125, it was in production from 1946 to 1949 in several variants. Total produced, 110,000. The 8G005Y used eight tubes, (2) 1LN5, 1LA6, 1LD5, 1LE3, (2) 1LB4, and 117Z6.

=== 500 series ===
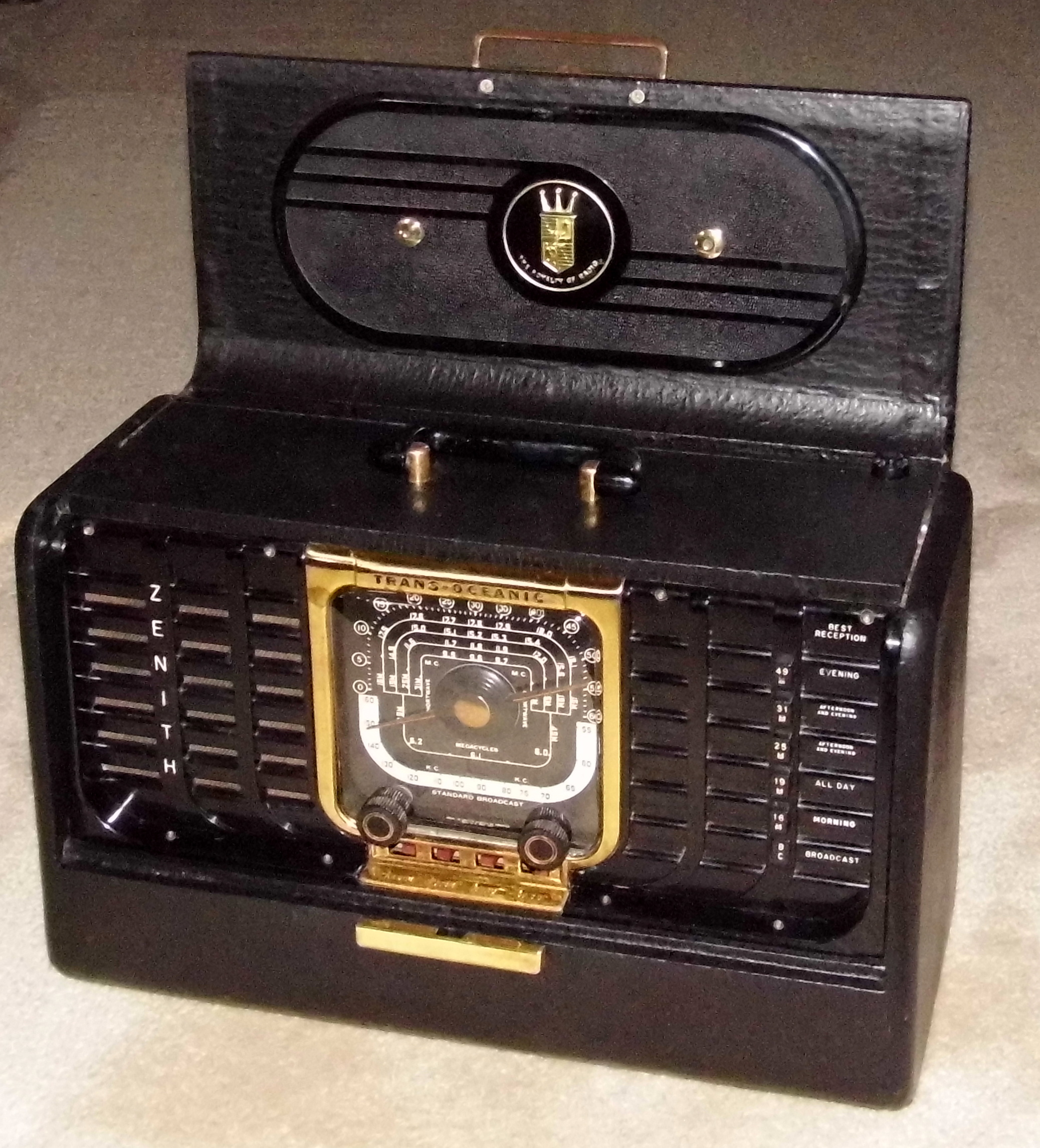
Zenith Trans-Oceanic Vacuum Tube Radio, Model G-500, circa 1949.

The 8G005Y was replaced in December 1949 by the G500—a 'changeover' model that had updated electronics using miniature tubes but the same appearance. The G500 held its price at less than $100 until it was withdrawn in mid-1951. Total production for the G500 was 90,000. The H500 'Super Trans-Oceanic' was introduced in May 1951 at an initial price of $99.95. It had a redesigned front face and incorporated many frequency coverage and electronic changes ordered by McDonald. There were 245,000 H-500s sold. The 500 series models used five tubes: a 3V4, 1U5, (2) 1U4, and 1L6.

There also was a production run in 1953-54, of 27,218 "militarized" H-500's, designated R-520/URR, ordered by the U.S. government for the Korean conflict. This set added a sixth tube, the 50A1, to eliminate power fluctuations.

=== 600 series ===
After 1953, there was competition to the Trans-Oceanic from both Hallicrafters, with their 'Trans-World' series sets, and RCA, with their 'Strato-World' models. In the spring of 1954, the 600 series was introduced with its 'slide-rule' type dial and a mains supply cord which coils inside the set on a spring-loaded reel. This model stayed in production, with minor changes, until the end of the T/O tube era in 1962. This "600" series used several letters to denote minor changes: L600 in 1954, R600 in 1955, T600 for 1955-56, Y600 for 1956-57, A600 for 1958, and B600 for 1959-62. Production for the 600 series was 270,000. The 600 series used six tubes: (2) 1U4, 1L6, 1L5, 3V4, and 50A1.

For a second time, there was a very small production run in 1956-57, of 2,973 "militarized" 600's, designated R-520A/URR, ordered by the U.S. government. Some of these were reportedly air dropped in small numbers during the Bay of Pigs invasion. Zenith was contracted to build 250 containers for this purpose. It is rumored that Fidel Castro made one his personal radio for years afterwards.

During the tube or valve T/O model run, this receiver did not include an 88-108 MHz FM radio band. Eugene McDonald died in 1958, but he was personally involved in the design changes to 'his' radio to the very end. In November 1957, Zenith introduced the all-new, nine transistor solid state Trans-Oceanic. The older tube-based Trans-Oceanic was continued in production until 1962.

=== Royal 1000/3000 series ===
In November 1957 the first of several transistorized Trans-Oceanics was introduced, the Royal 1000. As had always been the case, Commander E. McDonald helped in the design of the 1000. This was his last endeavor in the Trans-Oceanic radio before he died soon after its introduction. The Royal 1000 had the same frequency coverage as the A/B 600 series tube Trans-Oceanics with the addition of the 13/meter band. The new Royal 1000 also had an all-metal cabinet design with the front cover opening to the down position. The log chart was located inside the flip-down door. Very early Royal 1000s sported a genuine leather covering marked as such. Another first for portable radios was the unique dial scale used in the 1000 and later series of Trans-Oceanics. The 1000 was designed with a cylinder dial scale that would rotate with the band switch allowing only that particular band scale to show.

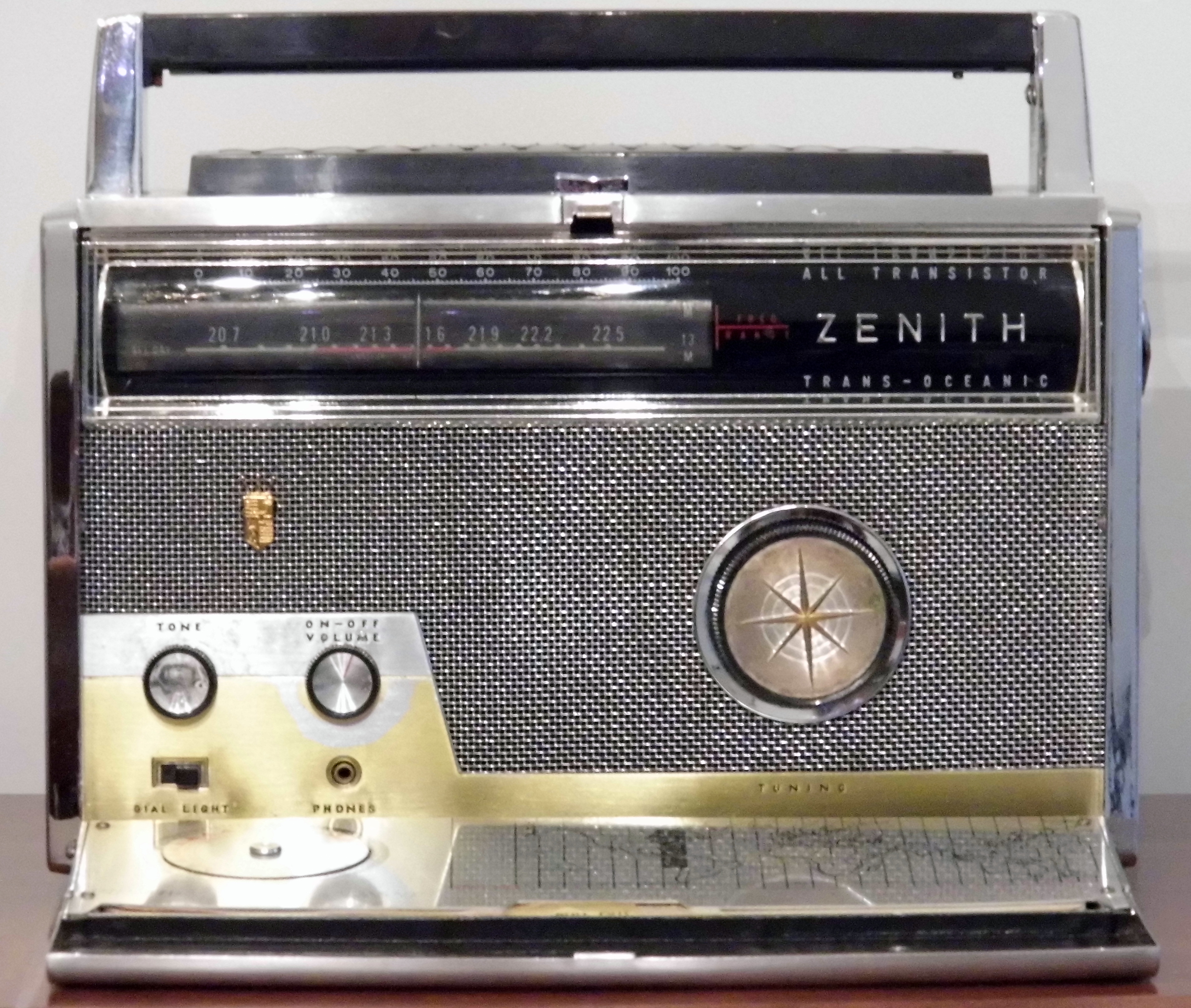
Zenith Royal 1000 All Transistor Trans-Oceanic Short Wave Portable Radio, circa 1957.

Soon after the introduction of the 1000 model, a second model, the Royal 1000D, added the LW band covering 150 kHz through 405 kHz just below the AM broadcast band. There were also slight cosmetic differences to distinguish the two models. Production totals for the Royal 1000 are estimated at 170,000. Anthony J. Cascarano was the primary designer of the Royal 1000/1000D cabinets. In 1962 the Royal 3000 was added and the 1000D eliminated while the 1000 remained in production through the 1968 model year. The 3000 added the FM broadcast band and eliminated the 13-meter band. Along with a few cosmetic differences, there wasn't much difference electrically between the new model and earlier 1000 series models aside from the addition of the FM subchassis and IF transformers. The 3000 used many of the same cabinet parts as the 1000/1000D, but required a bulging back cover to accommodate the additional parts used for FM.

Early 1000s and 1000Ds were battery-only with no provision for external power. This was considered acceptable because the battery life was much better than the tube-type models. 8 ordinary D cells would operate the radio for >500 hours, as opposed to ~150 hours for the tube models and their massive A/B battery. The 3000 was also introduced as battery-only. Later the 1000-1 and 3000-1 models were introduced with provision for an external power using what was one of the first "wall wart" type power supplies - a transformer, rectifier, and filter capacitor in a box with AC line connector that plugged into and hung from the wall socket. Estimated production for the Royal 3000 is 150,000.

Zenith introduced the Royal 2000 Trans-Symphony in 1960, the first AM/FM portable model. In 1963, it introduced the Royal 3000, a Trans-Oceanic with an added FM band.

=== Royal 7000 series ===
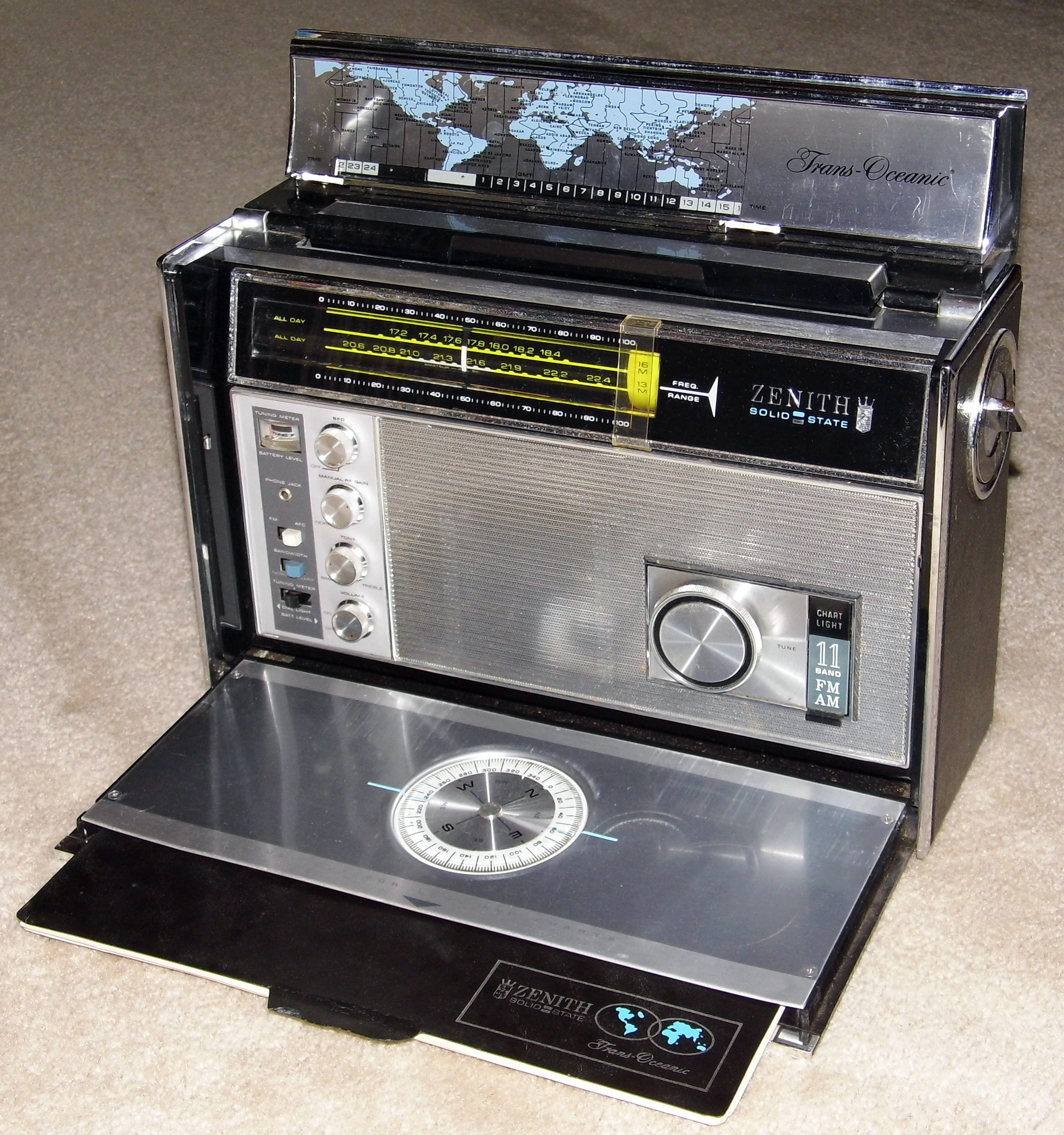
Zenith Royal 7000 Trans-Oceanic, circa 1968.

In 1968 the Royal 7000 series Trans-Oceanic was introduced. The new model sported a completely new look and many improvements over the weaknesses of the earlier 1000/3000 series models. Besides a new look, a BFO was added for SSB/CW reception. Also a wide/narrow filter switch was added for increased selectivity. The 13-meter band was re-introduced along with extended coverage from 1620 kHz through 2000 kHz and the VHF weather band. The electrical design was an improvement in both selectivity and sensitivity, and used modern silicon NPN transistors rather than the previous germanium types. Sound quality was much improved. The internal mechanical design was quite similar to the earlier models, and still used a steel chassis and point-to-point wiring, rather than PC boards. Production of the Royal 7000 is estimated at 130,000.

The last model Trans-Oceanic was the R7000 series introduced in 1979. This model now had complete coverage from 150 kHz through 30 MHz. Gone was the electrical band spread for improved tuning. The R7000 sported a new electrical design using modular circuit boards instead of the point to point hard wired chassis of all previous models. There were many other new features also such as dual tuning meters, squelch and several more bands such as Air, VHF 144 MHz through 175 MHz. The R7000 was built in Chicago for the first year but production was moved to Taiwan for the final two years, while all prior models had been made in the USA.

The new Royal line sold well, around 10,000 per year for the 3 year run but Zenith's lead was steadily eroded. By the time of the release of the 'R7000' in 1979, fierce competition from Sony in Japan—who, with their digital readout tuning dial had, in many ways, a superior product—meant the end of a famous product line.

== Photo gallery ==
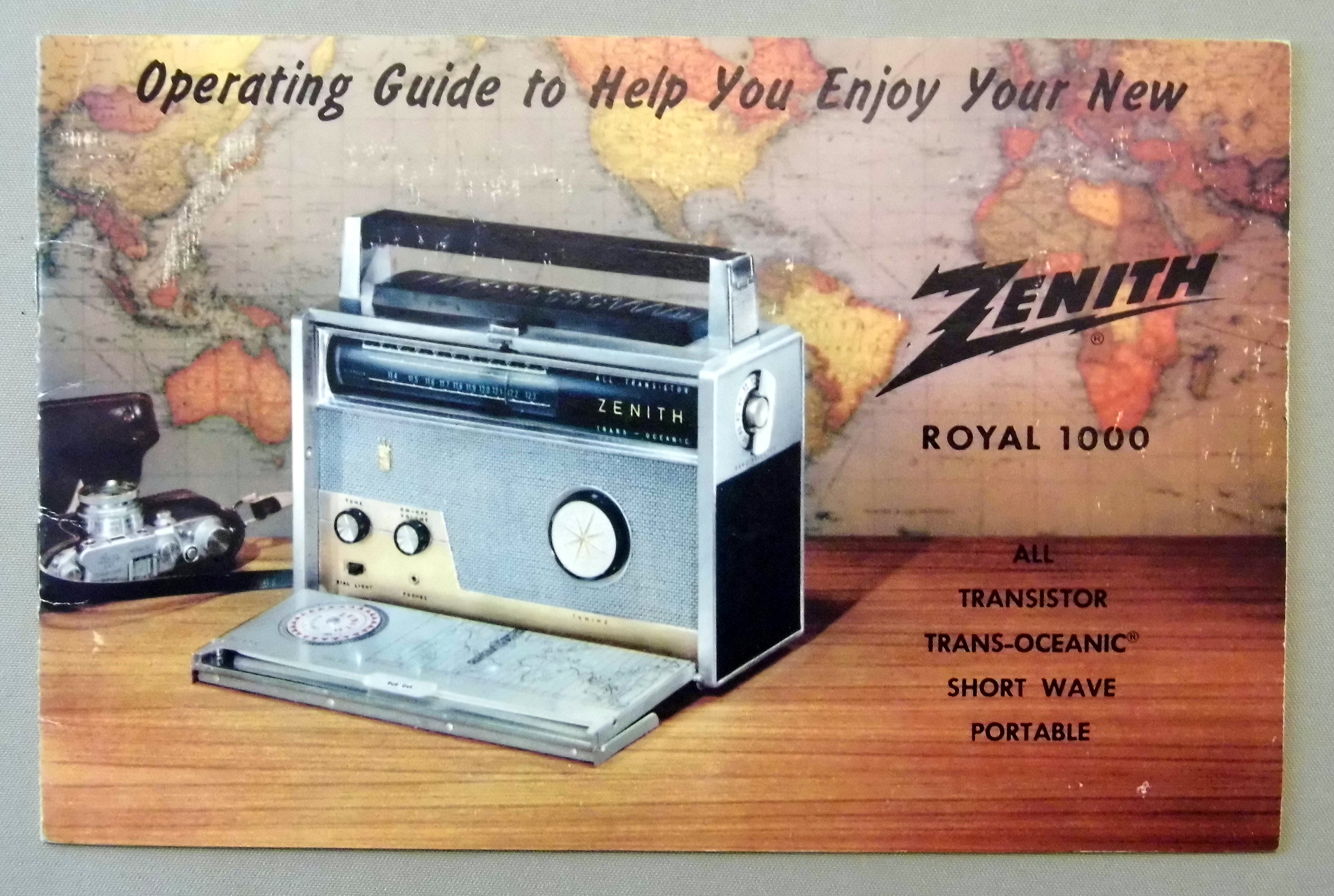
Zenith Royal 1000 Operating Guide

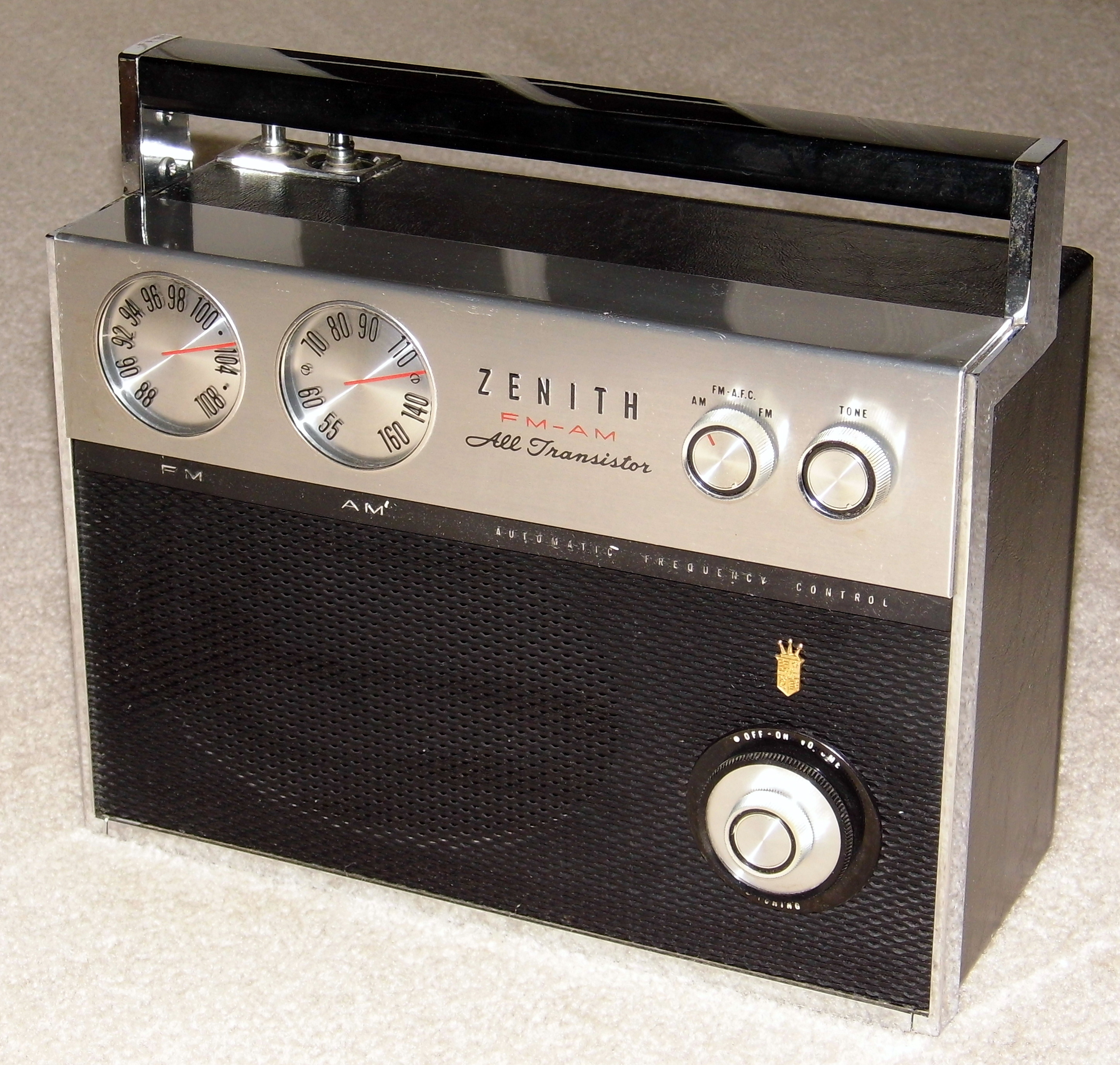
Zenith Royal 2000 Trans-Symphony AM/FM radio

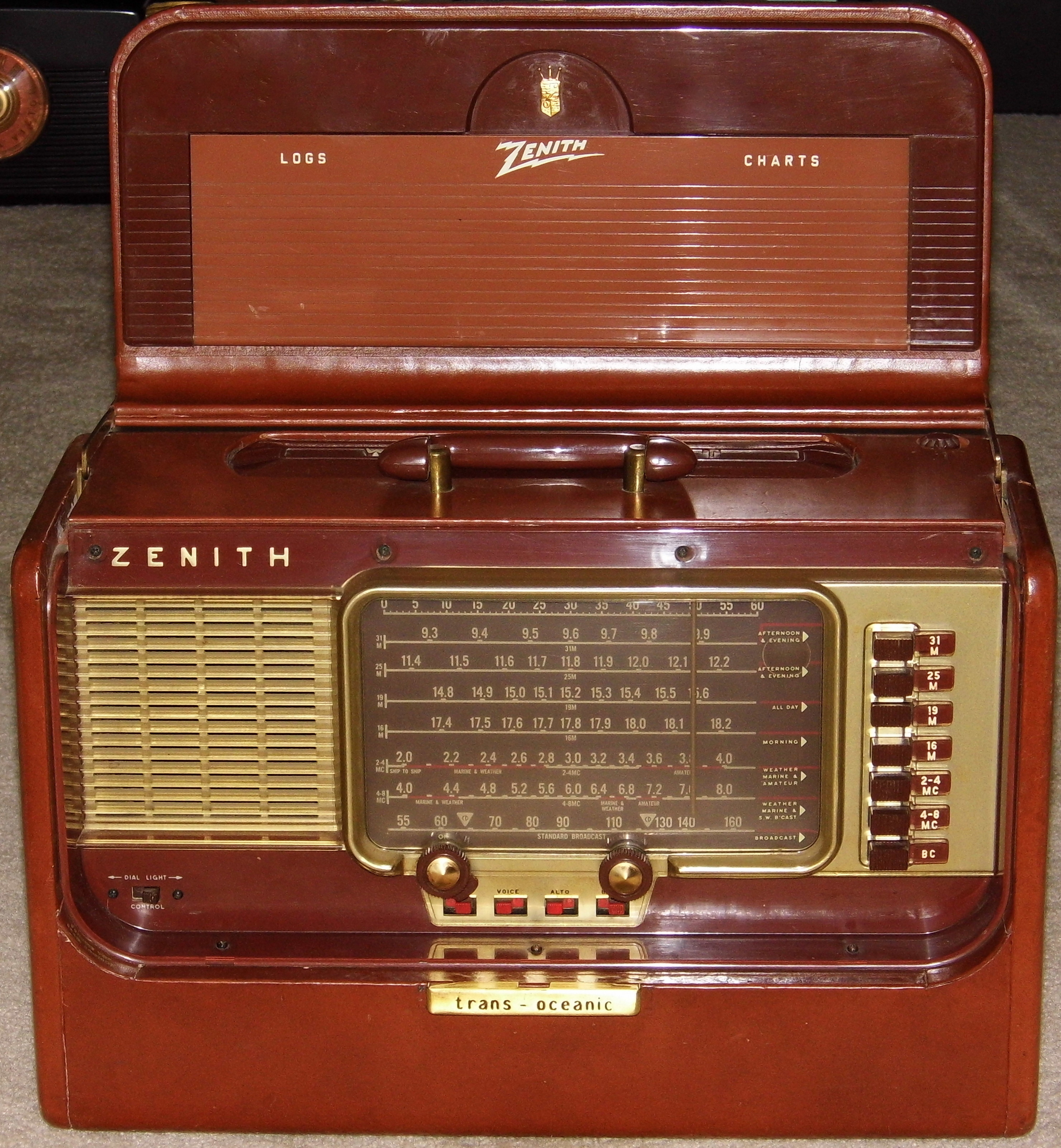
Zenith Transoceanic, Brown Leather, Model L600

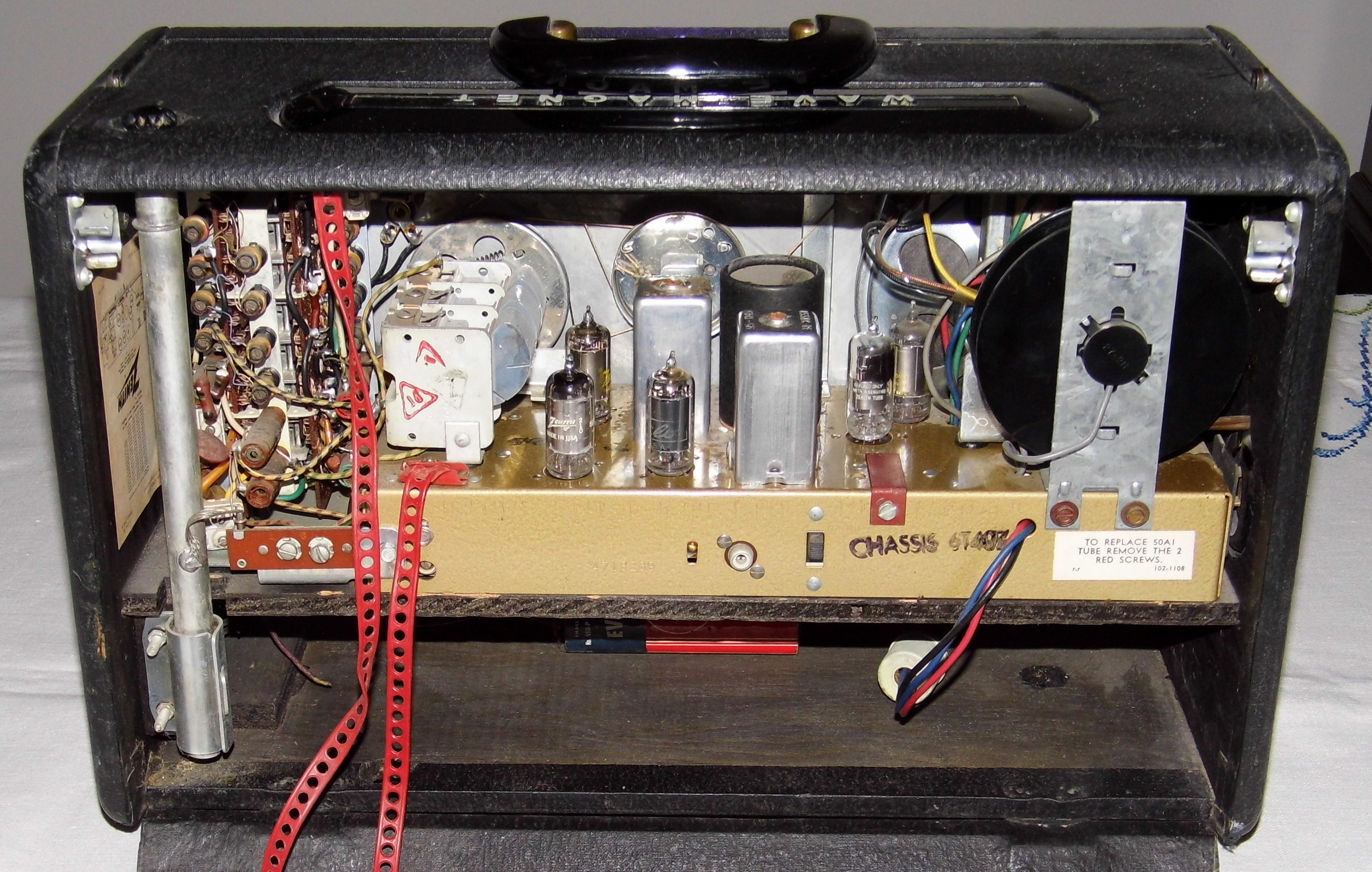
Zenith Trans-Oceanic, Model Y600, rear chassis

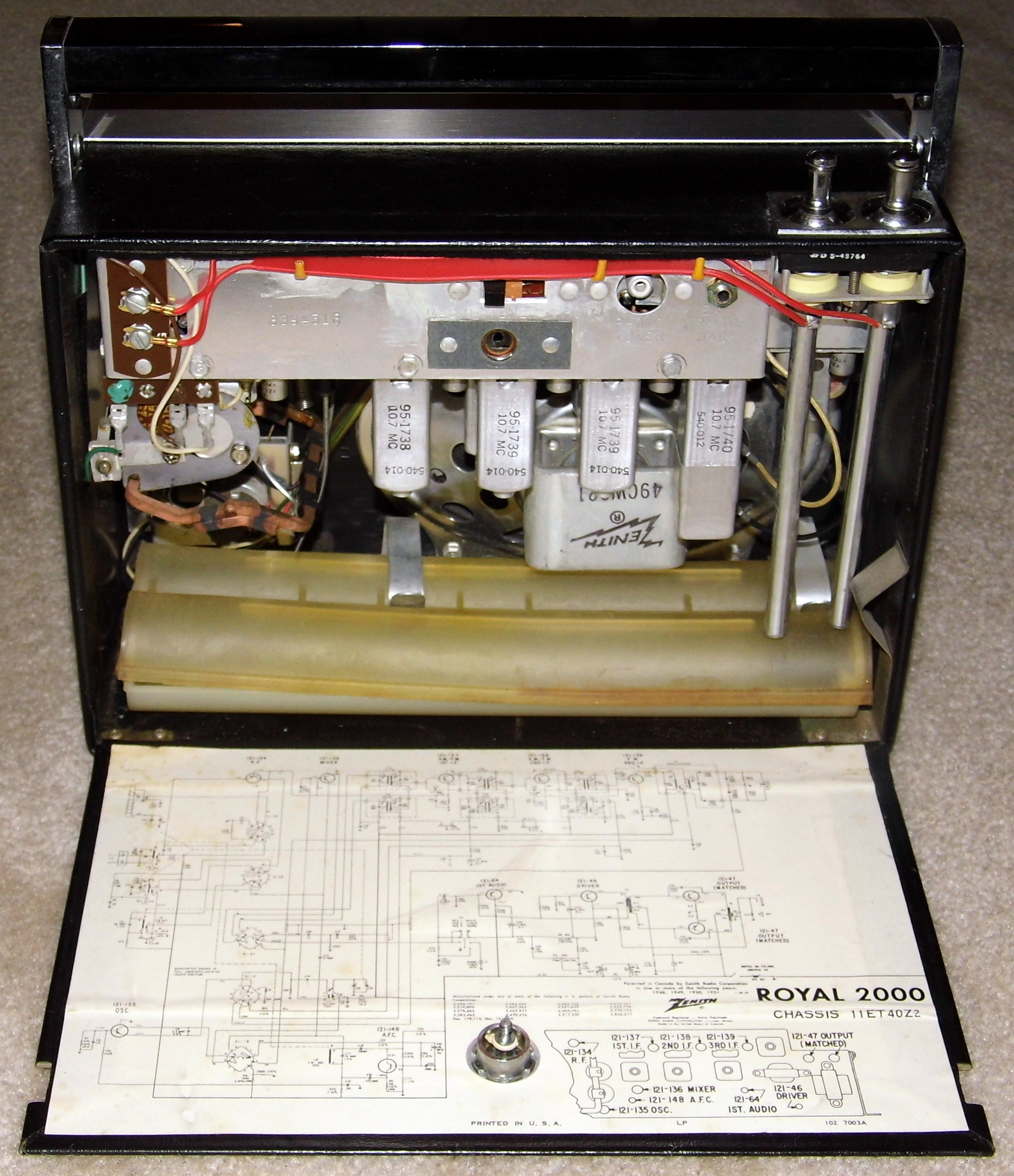
Zenith Royal 2000 Trans-Symphony, rear chassis

== See also ==
- Radio receiver
- Shortwave listening
- Zenith Electronics
- Eugene F. McDonald

== General references ==
- Bryant, John H. & Harold N. Cone (1995). The Zenith Trans-Oceanic: The Royalty of Radios. Atglen, Penn.: Schiffer Publishing. ISBN 9780887407086. OCLC 31708157.
