= Stephen Etnier =

American realist painter (1903–1984)

Stephen Morgan Etnier
- Born: September 11, 1903; York, Pennsylvania, United States
- Died: November 7, 1984 (aged 81); Harpswell, Maine, United States
- Education: Yale School of Art, Haverford College, Pennsylvania Academy of the Fine Arts
- Known for: Painting, murals
- Movement: Realism
- Spouse(s): Mathilde Gray (m. 1926–?; divorced), Elizabeth Morgan Jay (m. 1933–?; divorced), Jane Walden Pearce (m. 1948–1949; her death), Samuella "Brownie" Brown Rose (m. 1950–1983; divorce), Marcia Hall (m. 1983–1984; divorced)
- Children: 6
- Awards: Samuel F. B. Morse Gold Medal (1964), Saltus Medal (1955), Altman Medal (1956),

Stephen Morgan Etnier (September 11, 1903 – November 7, 1984) was an American realist painter, and an active painter for six decades. His work is distinguished by a mixture of realism and luminism, favoring industrial and working scenes, but always imbued with atmospheric light. Geographically, his career spanned the length of the eastern Atlantic and beyond.

== Childhood and education ==
Stephen Etnier was born on September 11, 1903, in York, Pennsylvania. His grandfather was E. Morgan Smith, the founder of Vioth Hydro. He was raised in a privileged environment in Wyndham Estate (now Wyndham Hills, Pennsylvania). From 1915 to 1922 he attended the Haverford and Hill schools in Pennsylvania, and Roxbury Tutoring School in Connecticut.

He transferring to Yale School of Art in December 1922, and matriculated into Yale University class of 1926. Re-entering Yale University he was later dismissed for poor grades. He entered Haverford College in 1924. Two years later in 1926, Etnier transferred to the Pennsylvania Academy of the Fine Arts, where he studied for four years.

From 1925 through 1929, he studied and apprenticed under the artists Henry Breckinridge, Rockwell Kent and John Carroll.

== Early career ==
Drawing inspiration from The Moon and Sixpence, Somerset Maugham's novel based on the life of the painter Paul Gauguin, Etnier pursued painting, launching his career with a solo exhibition at Dudensing Galleries, New York City in 1931. He soon moved to New York City's Milch Gallery, where he would remain until the 1960s.

Etnier's early work of 1930s and 1940s provides a record of his life at the time. His work shows street scenes in his home state of Pennsylvania, waterfronts from his travels to Haiti and the Bahamas, (and made while sailing the Eastern Seaboard aboard his 70-foot sailboat, Morgana), aerial perspectives created as he learned to fly, and dramatic Maine landscapes, painted while he renovated a stately 1862 home, "Gilbert Head".

Gilbert Head was on Long Island, Maine at the opening of the Kennebec River and across from Fort Popham and Popham Beach. Etnier and his wife Betsy lived on the Morgana for two years while they renovated the house. Her account of these years, On Gilbert Head, was published in 1937.

In 1938 he executed the mural "Waiting for the Mail," installed at the U.S. Post Office in Spring Valley, New York, and listed on the National Register of Historic Places in 1988. In 1940 he painted a second mural, "Mail for New England" at the Boston, Massachusetts. Everett Branch Post Office. In 2010 this mural was restored and reinstalled at the Clarendon Street Post Office in Boston.

== Military service ==
In 1941, at the age of thirty-eight, Etnier suspended his painting career to serve in the United States Navy. In May 1942, Etnier was commissioned as a lieutenant and assigned as commanding officer of the USS Mizpah, a North Atlantic convoy escort ship. In 1944, he was reassigned to the USS Tourmaline in Boston, and later to the USS General Omar Bundy in San Francisco. He completed his tour of duty in 1945.

== Later career ==
Etnier purchased land in South Harpswell, Maine in 1948 to build "Old Cove", his dream house and studio. Designed in collaboration with Portland, Maine architect James Saunders, the home featured a porch cantilevered over the ocean, north-facing windows for his studio, and a living room overlooking the ocean and framed by Mondrian-inspired window frames. Named for the private cove it overlooked, the home served as the foundation for a productive and increasingly serene period in Etnier's career. Old Cove was sold to new owners in 2014 and subsequently demolished.

The 1950s and 1960s mark a maturing, accomplished style in Etnier's work. Although still traveling south most winters in his boat, his life took a more domestic turn as he re-adopted Maine as his permanent home and married his fourth wife, Samuella "Brownie" Brown Rose. They were married for thirty-three years and had two sons. During those years, he painted daily, exhibited widely and enjoyed popular support, artistic awards and media attention.

Etnier's work became more architectural, marked by stark geometry, light and shadow, impressionistic figures and accents of color and modern culture. He adopted an artist's discipline of rising early and painting each morning (learned first from Rockwell Kent), seeking to capture the essence of Maine waterfronts and landscapes and the effects of light. The study of sunlight and water fascinated Etnier until the end of his career.

On November 7, 1984, Stephen Etnier died at Old Cove, comforted by his two sons.

Still Morning, 1960

Fort Popham, 1981

Storefront, Nassau, 1957

Study for Hurricane Ridge, Harpswell, ca. 1970

== Exhibitions and awards ==
Etnier exhibited frequently in galleries in Pennsylvania, Maine, New York and Dallas. His work appears in the permanent collections of the Metropolitan Museum of Art, Boston Museum of Fine Arts and other museums across the United States. Acclaim includes his election as an academician by the National Academy of Design and a retrospective exhibit at the Farnsworth Museum in Rockland, Maine in 1953; receipt of the Saltus Award by the National Academy of Design in 1955; a solo exhibition at York Junior College in York, Pennsylvania and the Samuel F. B. Morse gold medal from the National Academy of Design in 1964; and a solo exhibition at the Bristol Art Museum in Bristol, Rhode Island in 1965.

He also began his association with Midtown Galleries at 11 East 57th Street in New York City in 1969; and by 1971, Etnier had a solo exhibition at Midtown Galleries. Posthumous retrospective exhibitions were mounted at the Portland Museum of Art in 1998; and at the Historical Society of York County in York County, Pennsylvania in 1989.

In 1969, Etnier was awarded honorary doctorates of fine arts from Bates College and Bowdoin College in Maine.

== Marriages and children ==
Etnier married Mathilde Gray in 1926 at the Christ Episcopal Church in Greenwich, she was the daughter of John Lathrop Gray, Sr. and Harriet Hamilton Tyng of Greenwich, Connecticut. They had two daughters; Suzanne Mathilde Etnier Dignan (1927–1999), and Penelope Royall Etnier Tucker Jones (1929–). The first marriage ended in divorce.

He married writer Elizabeth Morgan Jay in 1933, of Westbury, New York (the great granddaughter of U.S. Chief Justice John Jay). They had two daughters: Stephanie Jay Etnier Doane (1936–2010), and Elizabeth Victoria "Vicky" Etnier (1940–). The second marriage ended in divorce before 1948.

Etnier's third wife was Jane Walden Pearce (or Jane Walden Pierce), they were married in 1948, and she died from a bullet wound to the head in June 1949 after a domestic fight over dishes.

His fourth wife was Samuella "Brownie" Brown Rose in 1950, which ended in divorce in 1983. They had two sons; John Stephen Etnier (1953–2023), and David Morrison Etnier (1955–).

Etnier's fifth and final marriage came in the last months of his life: he married Marcia Hall of Harpswell in 1983, They later divorced after a few months.
