= Zenith Electronics =

American electronics company

Zenith Electronics, LLC

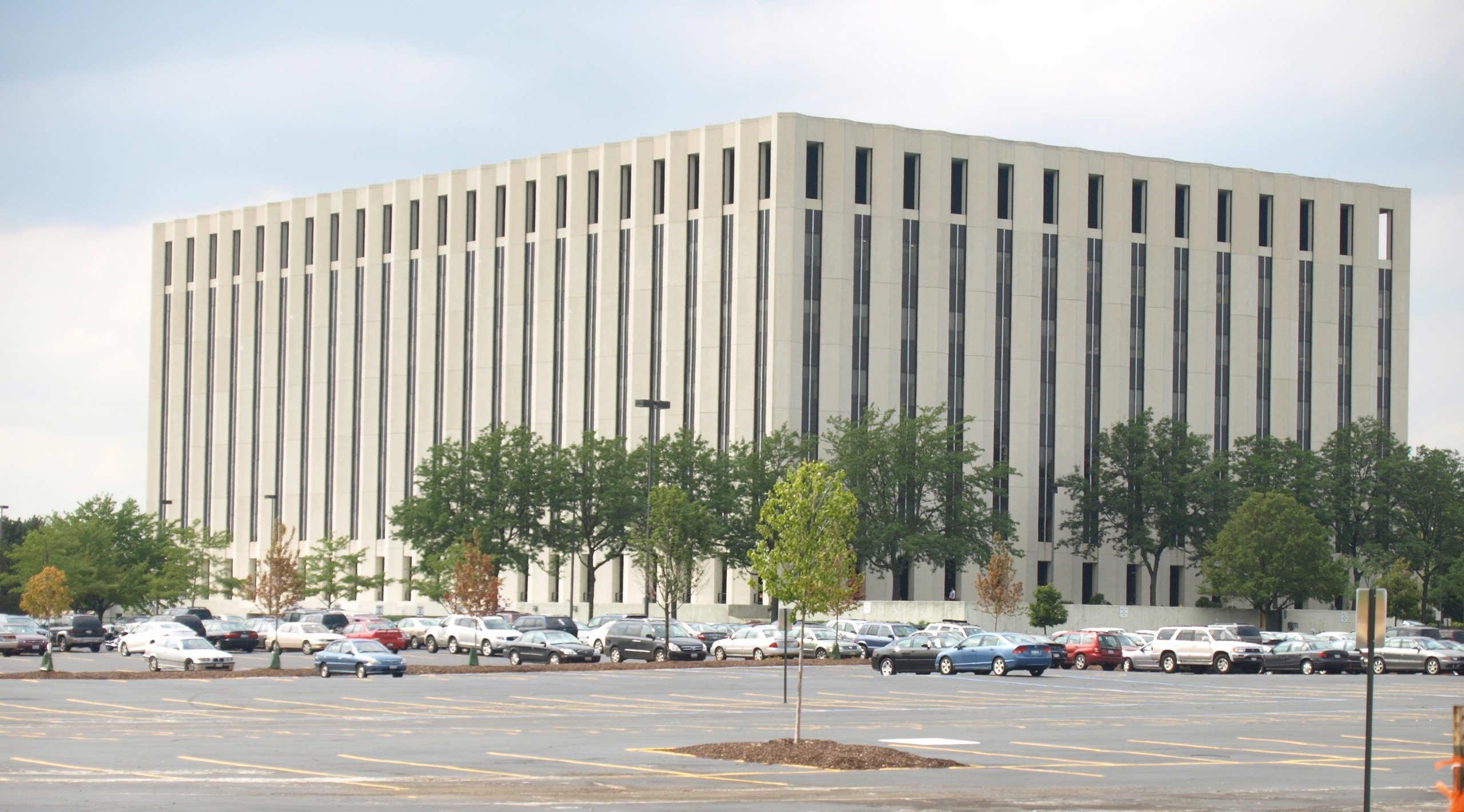
- Headquarters in Glenview, Illinois, from 1976 to 1999 (demolished in 2018)
- Formerly: Chicago Radio Labs (1918–1923); Zenith Radio Company (1923–1984); Zenith Electronics Corporation (1984–1999); Zenith Electronics, LLC (1999–present)
- Type: Subsidiary
- Traded as: NYSE: ZN (no longer traded since 1999 due to LG acquisition)
- Industry: Technology; Technology licensing
- Founded: 1918; 108 years ago (as Chicago Radio Labs); Chicago, Illinois, U.S.
- Founders: Ralph Matthews; Karl Hassel; Eugene F. McDonald
- Headquarters: Lincolnshire, Illinois, U.S.
- Key people: David Penski (CEO)
- Services: Research and development (ATSC and digital rights management technologies); technology licensing
- Revenue: ▼US$444.7 million (1999)
- Number of employees: 976
- Parent: LG Electronics (1999–present)
- Website: zenith.com

Zenith Electronics, LLC is an American research and development company that develops ATSC and digital rights management technologies. It is owned by the South Korean company LG Electronics. Zenith was previously a brand of consumer electronics, a manufacturer of radio and television receivers and other consumer electronics.

For many years, its famous slogan was "The quality goes in before the name goes on." Zenith was the inventor of subscription television and the modern remote control, and was the first to develop high-definition television (HDTV) in North America.

Previously headquartered in Glenview, Illinois, after a series of layoffs, the consolidated headquarters moved to Lincolnshire, Illinois. LG Electronics acquired a controlling share of Zenith in 1995; Zenith became a wholly owned subsidiary in 1999. Zenith-branded products were sold in North America, Germany, Thailand (until 1983), Cambodia, Laos, Vietnam, India, and Myanmar.

== History ==
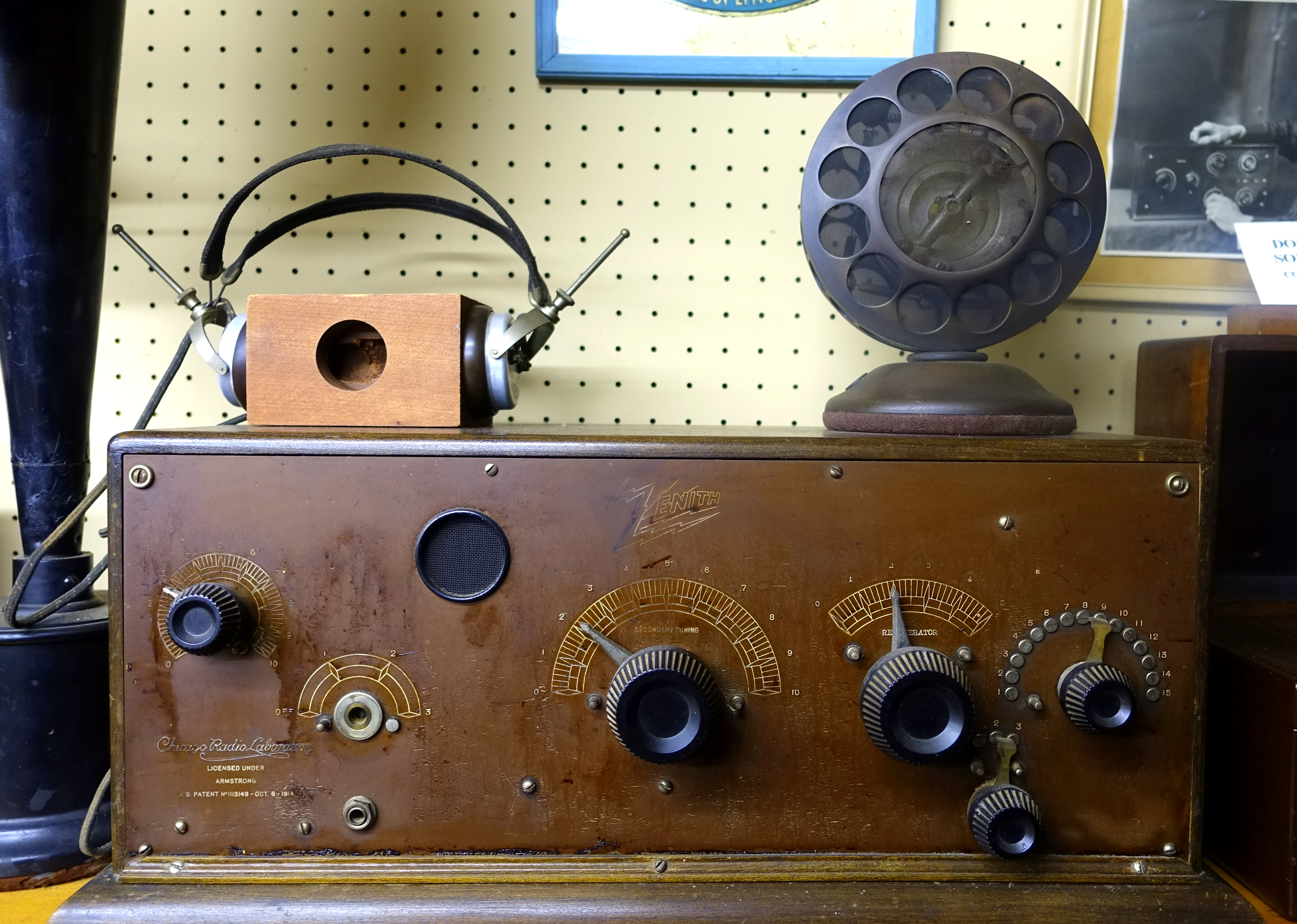
Zenith radio, Chicago Radio Laboratory

Logo used from 1923 to 1954
Logo used from 1954 to 1997

=== Chicago Radio Labs (1918–1923) ===
The company was co-founded by Ralph Matthews and Karl Hassel in Chicago, Illinois, as Chicago Radio Labs in 1918 as a small producer of amateur radio equipment. The name "Zenith" came from ZN'th, a contraction of its founders' ham radio call sign, 9ZN, and Zenith having the established meaning of the highest point reached by a given celestial object, or a time of success and notability. They were joined in 1921 by Eugene F. McDonald, and Zenith Radio Company was incorporated in 1923.

=== Zenith Radio Company (1923–1984) ===
The fledgling company soon became known for its high-quality radios and electronic innovations. Zenith introduced the first portable radio in 1924, the first mass-produced AC radio in 1926, and push-button tuning in 1927. It added automobile radios in the 1930s with its Model 460, promoting the fact that it needed no separate generator or battery, selling at US$59.95. The first Zenith television set appeared in 1939, with its first commercial sets sold to the public in 1948. The company is credited with having invented such things as the wireless remote control and FM multiplex stereo. For many years Zenith used the slogan "the quality goes in before the name goes on". This phrase was used by the Geo. P. Bent Piano Company of Chicago as early as 1906.

In 1922, the company founded a radio station in Chicago, WJAZ, and in 1926 successfully challenged the ability of the federal government to assign transmitting frequencies under existing regulatory authority. WJAZ was deleted in 1931. Zenith established one of the first FM stations in the country in 1940 (Chicago's WWZR, later called WEFM, named for Zenith executive Eugene F. McDonald), which was among the earliest FM multiplex stereo stations, first broadcasting in stereo in June 1961. The station was sold in the early 1970s and is now WUSN.

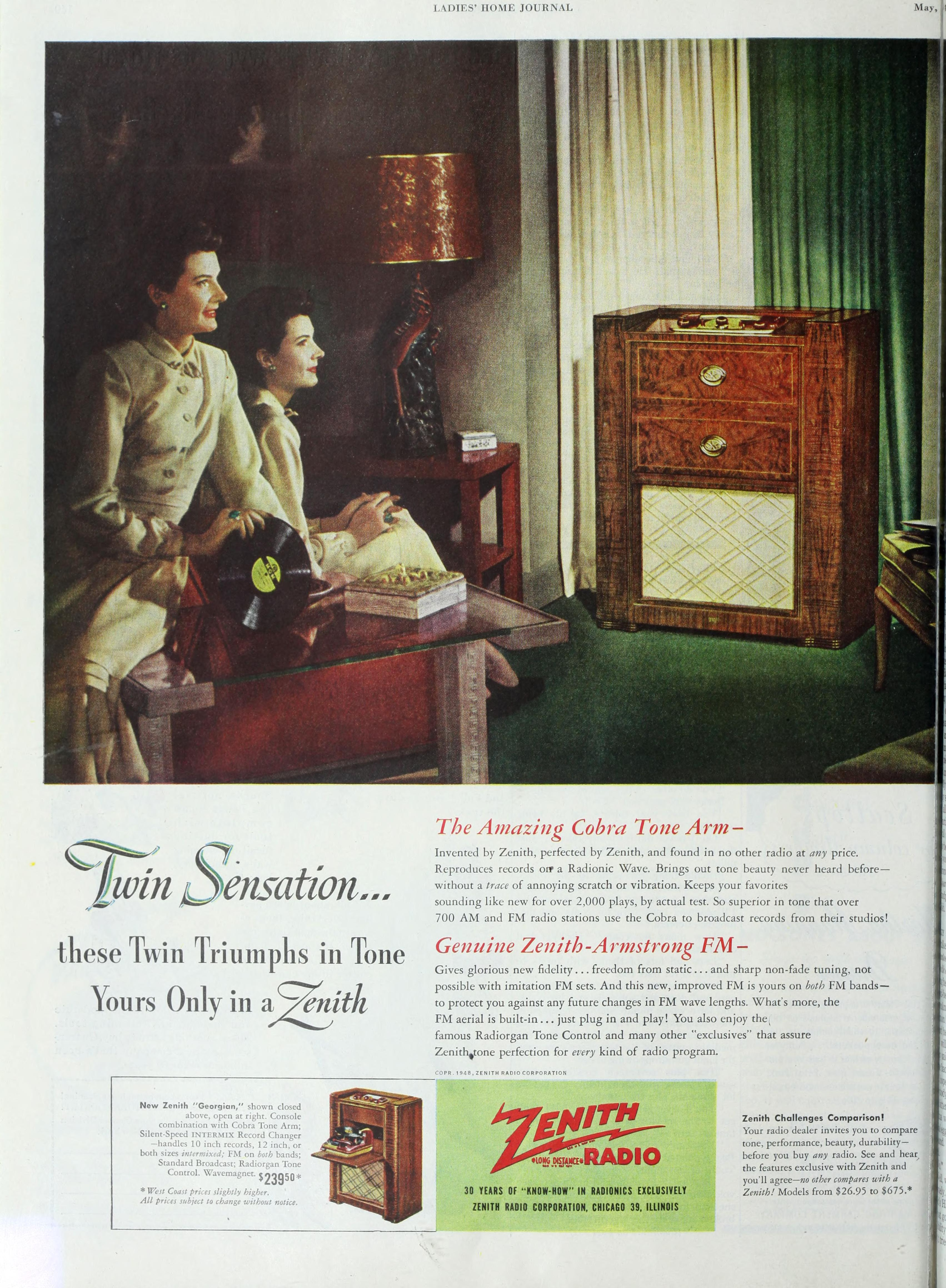
Zenith radio and record player advertised in the Ladies' Home Journal, 1948

Zenith pioneered the development of high-contrast and flat-face picture tubes, and the multichannel television sound (MTS) stereo system used on analog television broadcasts in the United States and Canada (as opposed to the BBC-developed NICAM digital stereo sound system for analog television broadcasts, used in many places around the world.) Zenith was one of the first companies to introduce a digital HDTV system implementation, parts of which were included in the ATSC standard, starting with the 1993 model Grand Alliance. They were one of the first American manufacturers to market a home VCR, selling a Sony-built Betamax video recorder starting in 1977.

By 1960 Zenith was with RCA among the two largest US television manufacturers, each with more than 20% of the market; 25 other companies had the rest of the market. The 1962 Illinois Manufacturers Directory (50th Anniversary edition) lists Zenith Radio Corporation as having 11,000 employees, of which at least 6,460 were employed in seven Chicago plants. The corporate office was in plant number 1, located at 6001 West Dickens Avenue (north of the Chicago, Milwaukee, St. Paul and Pacific railroad tracks), where 2,500 workers made radio and television sets and Hi-Fi stereophonic phonographs. Plant number 2 was located at 1500 North Kostner Ave., where 2,100 employees made government electronics, radio and television components, transistors and hearing aids. Plant number 3 was located at 5801 West Dickens Ave. (also north of the Milwaukee Road tracks), where 300 employees made electronics and did servicing. Plant number 4 was located at 3501 West Potomac Ave., where 60 employees handled warehousing. Plant number 5, located at 6501 West Grand Ave., employed 500-600 workers and manufactured government Hi-Fi equipment.

A subsidiary of Zenith, the Rauland Corporation, located at 4245 North Knox Avenue, employed 850 workers who produced television picture tubes. In the mid '60's, Rauland produced the RCA 21" round color CRT; in 1965 it added a 21" rectangular 21" color CRT. In 1966, Rauland bought the Keebler cookie plant in Melrose Park, Illinois for production of color CRTs. Rauland's Niles, Illinois, plant made flat-face radar picture tubes, night vision microchannel image tubes for the military, and many specialty tubes. The other Zenith subsidiary in Chicago was Central Electronics, Incorporated, located at 1247 West Belmont Ave., where 100 employees made amateur radio equipment and performed auditory training. Another Central Electronics plant was located at State Route 133 and Grandview in Paris, Illinois, where 500 employees made radio receivers, with the total Zenith work force in Illinois being thus at least 6,960.

In December 1970, National Union Electric ("NUE") sued most of the Japanese television manufacturers for violation of the Anti-Dumping Act and a conspiracy they alleged violated American antitrust laws. During the pendency of that suit, Zenith Radio Corporation encountered increasing financial difficulty as its market share progressively went to Japanese companies. Zenith joined two other U.S. companies—Sears, Roebuck and Co. and Motorola, Inc.—as co-plaintiffs. The NUE suit was transferred to the Eastern District of Pennsylvania, and the two suits were consolidated for pretrial proceedings and trial. The suit, styled In re Japanese Electric Products Antitrust Litigation, sought $900 million in damages.

By the end of 1983, Zenith had spent millions of dollars in connection with the litigation. In 1981, the trial court entered summary judgment on the antitrust and antidumping claims and dismissed the lawsuits. Plaintiffs appealed, and the appellate court affirmed the summary judgment for Sears, Roebuck and Co., Motorola, Inc., and Sony. The case was appealed, and in March 1986 the Supreme Court of the United States ruled in favor of the defendants on Zenith's antitrust claims. Zenith's hopes to salvage a victory on the claims that the defendants violated the Antidumping Act of 1916 ended in April 1987, when the Supreme Court refused to hear an appeal from the U.S. District Court of Appeals in Philadelphia that upheld the ruling of the trial court in favor of the Japanese.

In 1979, Zenith entered the computer market with the purchase of Heath Company from Schlumberger for $64.5 million, forming Zenith Data Systems (ZDS). Jerry K. Pearlman said in 1981 that "there should be a big Z on the top" of anything electronic in the home, and Zenith wanted to prepare for additional competition from computer and electronics makers.

=== Zenith Electronics Corporation (1984–1999) ===
The company changed its name to Zenith Electronics Corporation in 1984 to reflect its interests in computers and CATV, having left the radio business two years earlier.

ZDS was very successful. By the late 1980s its profits were sustaining its parent, while from 1987 Zenith's consumer business lost money. By 1988 the company was the last American television manufacturer, and reportedly decided to also exit the consumer market and sell its television business. To raise money for HDTV research efforts and reduce debt, Zenith instead sold ZDS to Groupe Bull in October 1989 for $635 million. By 1990, Zenith was in trouble and looking more attractive to a hostile takeover. To avoid this, Zenith sold a five-percent stake to the Korean company GoldStar (now LG Electronics) as part of a technology-sharing agreement. With its analog line aging (the last major update to the line had been the System³ chassis in 1978)), and the adoption of HDTV in the United States decades away, Zenith's prospects were poor.

In 1995 LG, increased its stake to 55 percent, enough to assume controlling interest. Zenith was too small to compete in the consumer electronics industry, which had become global in nature, and its high-quality products made it attractive for acquisition.

=== Zenith Electronics, LLC (1999–present) ===
Zenith filed for Chapter 11 bankruptcy in 1999, and in exchange for its debts, LG bought the remaining 45 percent of the company, converting about $200 million of debt owed to it by Zenith into common stock in the revamped company. The shares of existing stockholders were rendered worthless.

During this period, some of Zenith's products were being rebadged as OEM under the Admiral name. Certain products carried the Allegro brand, which had originated in the 1970s as a brand for Zenith speakers and other audio equipment. Their profitable Network Systems division, which produced set-top boxes for cable and satellite TV, was sold to Motorola in the summer of 2000 and became part of Motorola BCS (Broadband Communications Sector).

The Zenith headquarters building was occupied by Aon and subsequently demolished in 2018 to create room for nearby Abt Electronics to expand.

LG produced the Zenith DTT-900 and Zenith DTT-901 ATSC digital television converter box. LG offered some Zenith-branded plasma, LCD, and direct-view televisions through selected retail outlets.

== Notable products ==
=== Shortwave radio ===
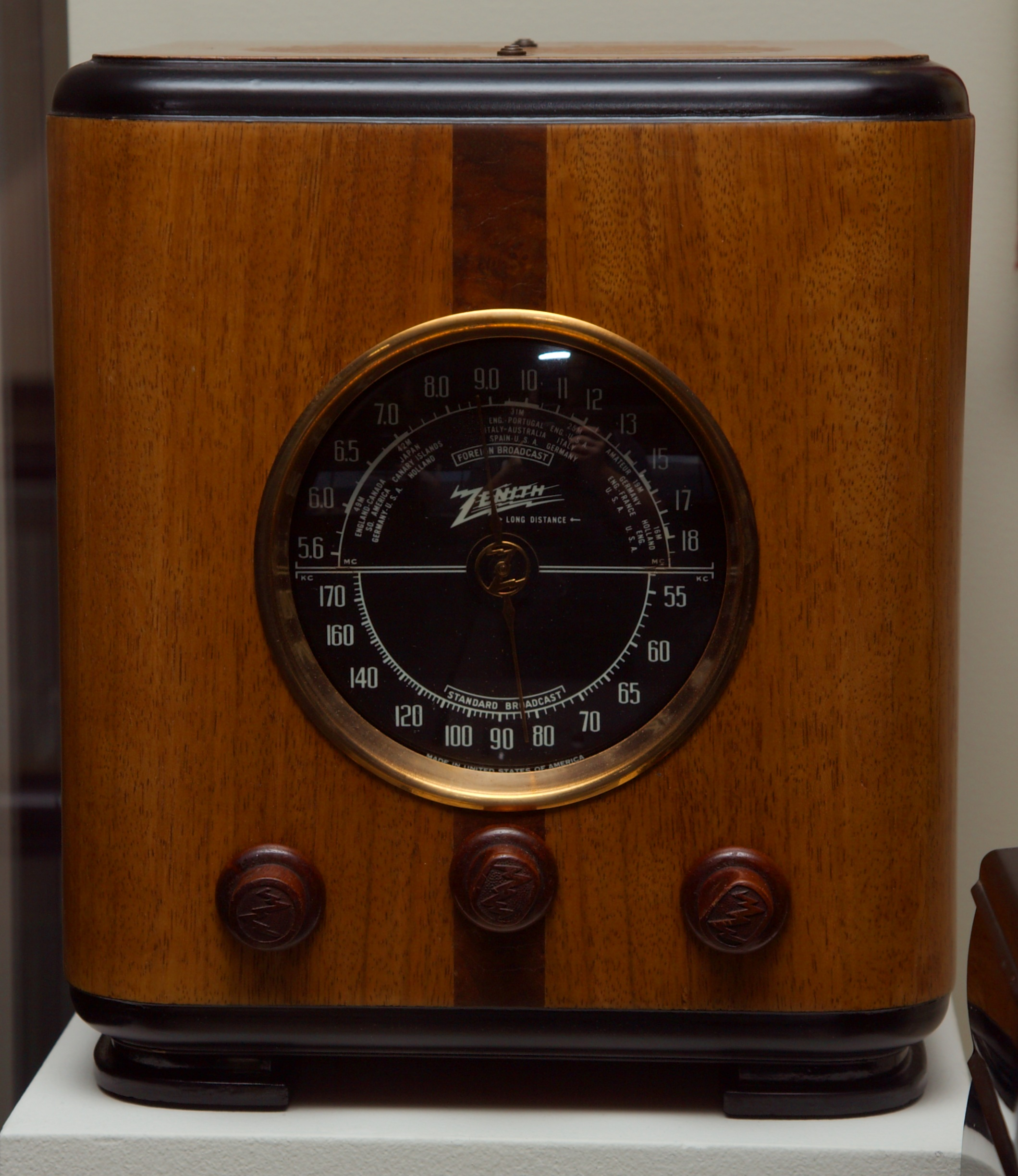
A Zenith Model 5-S-220 "cube" radio c. 1937

Among Zenith's early famous products were the "Royal" series of transistor radios and the "Trans-Oceanic" series of shortwave portable radios, which were produced from 1942 to 1981.

=== Subscription television ===
Zenith was the first company to experiment with subscription television, launching its Phonevision system with experimental Chicago station KS2XBS (originally broadcasting on Channel 2 before the Federal Communications Commission forced them to relinquish it to WBBM-TV). Their experiment involved a descrambler box mounted on the television set, and plugged into the telephone lead. When a preannounced broadcast was ready to begin, viewers would call an operator at Zenith who would send a signal with the telephone leads to unscramble the video.

While the Theatre Owners of America claimed the concept was unsuccessful, Zenith itself claimed the experiment was a success. As Phonevision broadcast films, it was seen as a potential competitor for traditional theatres. In spite of the fact that the three films initially available to the first 300 test households were more than two years old, about 18 percent of Phonevision viewers had seen them at the movies, and 92 percent of Phonevision households reported that they would prefer to see films at home.

=== Remote controls ===
Zenith is, perhaps, best known for the first practical wireless television remote control, the Space Command, developed in 1956.

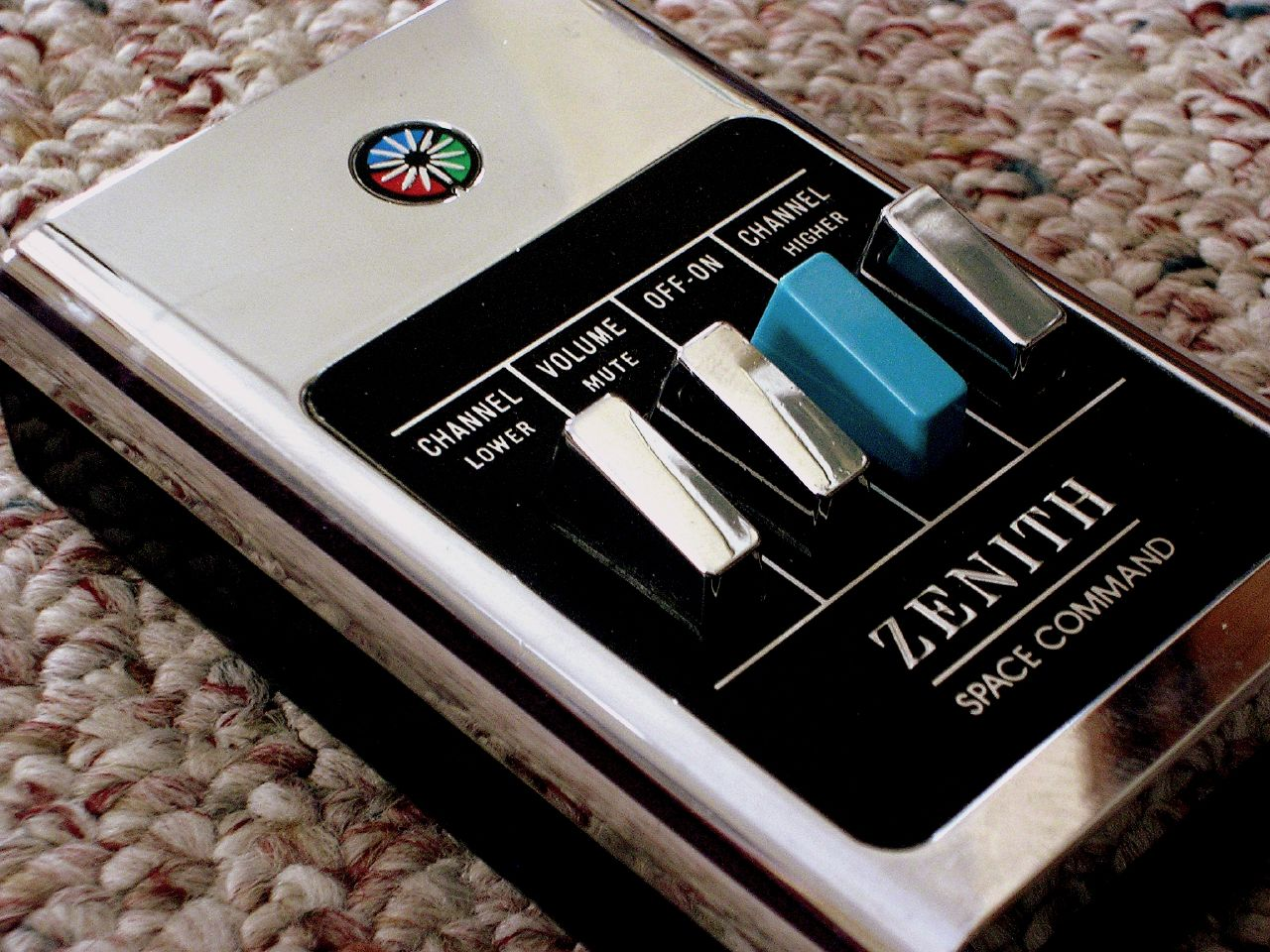
A Zenith Space Command 600 remote control

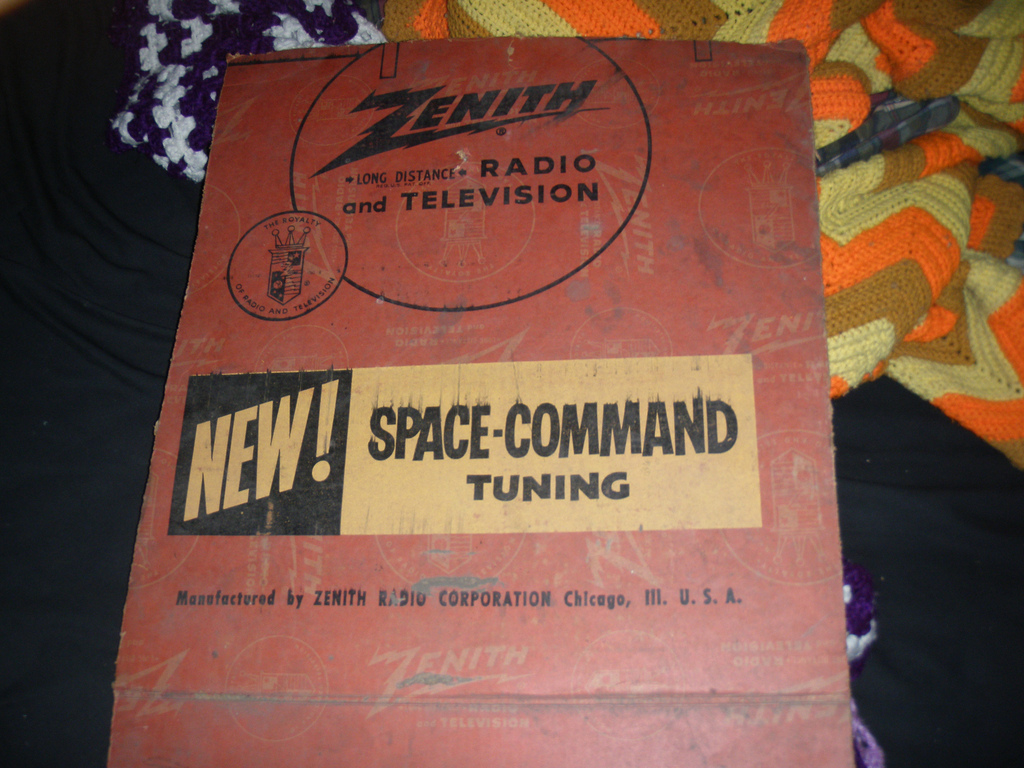
A box advertising a remote control system often referred to as "Space Command Tuning"

The original television remote control was a wired version, released in 1950, that soon attracted complaints about an unsightly length of cable from the viewer's chair to the television receiver. Eugene F. McDonald, Zenith President and founder, ordered his engineers to develop a wireless version, but the use of radio waves was soon discounted due to poor interference rejection inherent in 1950s radio receivers. The 1955 Flash-Matic remote system, invented by Eugene Polley, used a highly directional photo flash tube in the hand held unit that was aimed at sensitive photoreceivers in the four front corners of the television cabinet. However, bright sunlight falling on the television was found to activate the controls. These remote controls would activate a motor, causing the tuning dial on the television to switch by itself, and this could be used for mischief if someone else was attempting to tune the television.

Lead engineer Robert Adler then suggested that ultrasonic sound be used as a trigger mechanism. This was produced in the hand held unit by mechanically struck aluminum rods of carefully constructed dimensions—a receiver in the television responded to the different frequencies this action produced. Enough audible noise was produced by pressing the buttons that consumers began calling remote controls "clickers". The miniaturization of electronics meant that, eventually, the sounds were produced in the remote unit electronically; however, the operating principle remained in use until the 1980s, when it was superseded by the infrared light system.

Zenith said that Space Command increased television sales by 40%. The company licensed the technology to RCA and others, and twice successfully sued Admiral for violating its patent. The photograph is of a Space Command 600, which was the remote control designed for use with its color television receivers. The Space Command 600 was introduced in 1965 and this particular design was in use until the end of the 1972 model year. The Space Command 600 remote control had an additional, distinctive feature—this remote control could also adjust color hues. By pressing the mute button on the remote, a relay would be activated at the television in which to transfer the VHF motor drive tuner circuit to the motorized hue control. This would allow the user to adjust the hue in increments by depressing the channel up or down buttons on the remote control, and restore the television to normal tuning operation when the mute button was pressed again (mute off).

=== Space phone ===
Some models of Zenith's System 3 line of televisions made from the late 1970s to the early 1990s had a feature called the Space Phone by Zenith. It was basically a hands-free speakerphone built into the television set. It used the set's speaker and remote control, in addition to a built-in microphone. A Space Phone-enabled television would connect to a telephone jack (using a built-in phone cord), and making a call was performed by pressing a button on the remote to activate the Space Phone (which would mute and begin controlling the program audio going to the speaker). The telephone number is dialed using the numeric keys on the remote, which then displays the digits being dialed on-screen (using the on-screen display features of the System 3 line). The user could then converse with another caller hands-free, much like a regular speakerphone.

=== The porthole television ===
In the late 1940s, Zenith entered the television market. These sets were all-round tube sets. The main feature was that the entire round screen was exposed. They were available in 12-inch, 16-inch and 19-inch sizes. Later round-tube models had a switch that would show the picture in the 4:3 ratio, or have the entire round screen exposed. These sets are very desirable among television collectors. Many porthole sets used metal-cone CRTs, which are now scarce. It is not uncommon for collectors to replace a bad metal-cone tube with an all-glass tube. Zenith porthole sets came in tabletop models, stand-alone consoles and television/radio/phono combos.

=== Hand-wired chassis ===
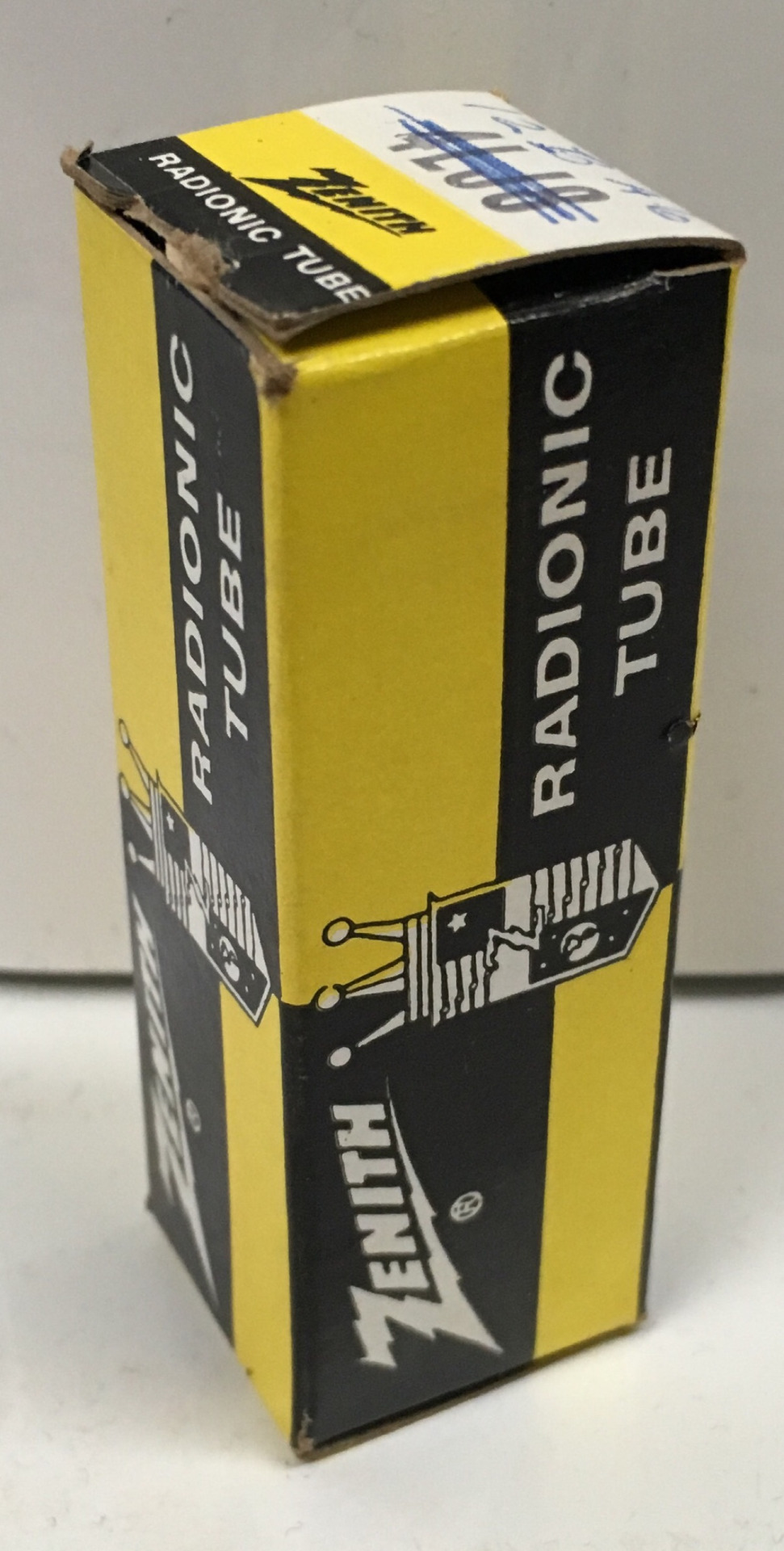
Zenith vacuum tube carton

In the late 1950s, many electronic manufacturers, such as RCA, General Electric and Admiral, were changing from hand-wired metal chassis in their radios and televisions to printed circuit boards. While circuit boards save time and errors in assembly, they are not well suited for use with vacuum tube equipment, in which high temperatures are generated that can break down boards, eventually causing the boards to crumble if one attempts to remove a tube. Zenith, and to a lesser extent Motorola, avoided this problem by continuing to use hand wired chassis in all its vacuum tube equipment. Zenith kept circuit boards out of its televisions until the Chromacolor line of the early 1970s, and even then used them only with solid state components, mounting the four tubes used in the Chromacolor "4 tube hybrid" on the steel chassis. Zenith began using circuit boards in radios when it converted to solid-state in the late 1960s, but even Zenith's early transistor radios were completely hand wired with socketed transistors. Due to the use of this chassis construction (and the high quality components), Zenith televisions and radios of the 1950s to 1970s found today are often still working well, needing little work to restore them to like-new operating condition.
