= Motorola Trunked Radio =

Motorola Trunked Radio for telecommunications is a trunked radio system developed by Motorola.

== Types ==
- Type I
- Type II
- Type IIi Hybrid
- Type II SmartZone
- Type II SmartZone OmniLink
- Type II VOC

Motorola Type I and Type II systems achieve the same thing in a slightly different way. One important distinction between these systems is the amount of data transmitted by each radio when the operator pushes the PTT button. A Type I system transmits the radio's ID, its fleet information, and the subfleet information. A Type II system only transmits the radio's ID.

What’s the difference? In Type I systems, each radio in the trunk group individually transmits its own affiliation. In Type II systems the trunk system maintains a database that determines each radio's affiliation. Another difference between the systems is that Type I systems are arranged in a fleet-subfleet hierarchy. For example, it is possible for a city using a Type I system to designate four fleets, each with eight subfleets. The police department, fire department, utilities group, and city administration could each be a separate fleet. The police might decide to further divide its fleet into subfleets, such as dispatch, tactical operations, detectives, north, south, east and west side patrols and supervisors. All the available police radios would then be assigned to one of the police subfleets, letting the police centralize their communications and control the type of users on a single system. Determining the exact fleet-subfleet hierarchy for a particular area is referred to as fleet map programming.

The disadvantage of a Type I system is that the brief burst of data sent when a user transmits must contain the radio's ID, its fleet information, and the subfleet information as well. This is three times the amount of data a Type II system radio sends. Since the data capacity of Type I systems is limited, and the total amount of data increases with each user, Type I systems usually accommodate fewer users than Type II systems. Nevertheless, Type I systems are still in use.

== Digital Voice Types ==
- ASTRO - proprietary VSELP vocoder implementation and IMBE vocoder implementation for APCO-25 Common Air Interface
