= LTR MultiNet =

APCO-16 compliant LTR Trunked Radio Systems

LTR MultiNet Systems are APCO-16 compliant LTR Trunked Radio Systems and thus are mostly found in use as public safety systems. LTR MultiNet systems usually have one or more "status channels" that act like a control channel in a Motorola or EDACS system, however these channels can also carry voice transmissions simultaneously.

== APCO 16 compliance ==
Some trunked systems queue calls if a user's attempt to transmit gets a busy signal. In other words, if someone presses their push-to-talk button and all trunked radio system channels are busy, some systems will wait-list users in the same order as their busy signals occur. When a channel becomes available, the system notifies the user. There is disagreement about MultiNet's ability to queue calls when all channels are busy. Usually, the control channel is the path allowing wait-listed users to get in line. One publication says MultiNet communicates using low baud rate data multiplexed under voice if all channels are busy. One report says MultiNet users on a live system who got a busy had to either hold their push-to-talk button down continually until the system assigned them a channel or periodically check for an available channel by repeatedly pressing the push-to-talk.

== Typical system capabilities ==
Like any trunked system, LTR MultiNet allows users to be grouped to virtual channels on a system backbone. The system backbone consists of repeaters configured to support the LTR protocol. The virtual channels, called system and group, are controlled by the system electronics. In an LTR system, the electronics that set up communications between radios are housed in each radio set, (scan-based). The MultiNet system has some form of central controller in addition to the scan-based radio electronics. When idle, radios scan all system channels searching for a valid system-and-group call. When a valid call is detected, all radios set to the detected system and group, (virtual channel) meet on a physical channel and can communicate. A valid call could be an individual call or a call to a group of radios.

There are group virtual channels, where groups of mobile and hand held radios are addressed based on their system and group (virtual channel selector) setting. On a commercial system, a typical group might be a small business such as a towing company. On a government system, a typical group might be a group of people in a department with similar tasks such as the city street department. When any user in the group talks, all radios with their selector set to that group meet on a virtual channel and can communicate. When the conversation ends, radios immediately begin a search for another call.

Units can be individual-called: a dispatcher can call a single mobile or hand-held radio and initiate a conversation that will not be heard by any other radios in the system. A form of individual call is the telephone patch. Some systems allow half-duplex telephone calls to be placed. The radio user must use the push-to-talk button to speak and cannot talk and receive simultaneously.

Unlike central-controlled trunked systems, LTR MultiNet does not provide a busy queue. If a user gets a busy signal, they will not automatically be called when a channel becomes available.

Radios have an "emergency" capability which can alert a dispatch center that the person with the radio has pressed an emergency button and needs assistance.

== San Rafael, California Police Department system ==
After six years of use, a consultant was hired in May 1994 to evaluate perceived problems with the Police LTR MultiNet radio system. A committee was convened to review the consultant report and devise a strategy to resolve issues. A 1995 report to the Mayor and City Council found the city's Police LTR system could not be fixed, "...without redesigning or replacement of the E. F. Johnson system and/or its components." The report describes problems with the specific MultiNet system implemented by San Rafael Police including:

- As implemented, the trunked system had only two channels. While more channels were needed to resolve provisioning problems, the city did not have sufficient loading to qualify for licensing of additional channels under Federal Communications Commission (FCC) rules. Examples of provisioning problems included the FCC-required Morse code identifier would put one channel out of service, causing busy signals.
- The report suggests the system, as implemented, did not have adequate signal strength coverage of the hilly terrain around San Rafael. Users reported out-of-range indicators were displayed when at North Gate Mall, Point San Pedro east of the high school, Kaiser San Rafael Emergency Room, San Rafael Police locker room, Marin County Jail sally port, and the "canal area."
- Unit ID and emergency buttons did not perform reliably. Investigation was unable to reveal what caused this intermittent problem. In some cases, dispatchers got "ghost emergency button" signals: distress messages were received when the user had not pressed the emergency button, (called falsing). In another, a user pressed the emergency button but the button press was not received by dispatch.
- The system experienced intermittent reception among field units and at the dispatch console. In one instance, the report describes an officer at the scene of a call. A dispatcher makes an announcement: the officer's hand-held radio hears the call while the vehicle radio does not. It also cites an event where two officers were in a "potentially-deadly" situation and had to shout to one another because their radios could not communicate. Because calls to dispatch were sometimes not heard, there was friction between officers and dispatchers: officers thought the dispatcher was ignoring their call.
- The system was split into two transmitter coverage areas, requiring officers to remember to manually select an alternate channel when in certain parts of the city.
- The mutual aid patch allowed dispatch to set up a connection which allowed San Rafael officers to communicate with all other agencies in the county. The system patched a system and group setting on the trunked system to a 39 MHz base station. (All other agencies in the county used 39 MHz radio systems.) Users complained about long time constants (measured at 0.7 seconds) from the time an officer pressed the push-to-talk on a trunked radio until users on 39 MHz started to hear what they were saying. There were also problems with "lost transmissions." These problems caused messages to be repeated, which tied up channels and increased the potential for busy signals on the MultiNet system. The report says the patch system was abandoned, removing the department's mutual aid interoperability capability.
- Reliability problems with equipment were cited. In one example, a problem with mobile radios losing their programming put 25% of the police vehicle fleet out of service.
- A cumbersome servicing records system had to be established to track the equipment inventory. For example, when system software updates were required, city employees had to track which radio units had gotten the updates. A records system tracking all 97 radio units and their present software revision was established and maintained. The inventory system also tracked which units were at the shop and which ones were tagged as needing repair. These costs were absorbed by the Police Department.
- Ready and busy signal tones were adjusted by the radio set's volume control. This resulted in situations where users got a busy signal but could not hear it because the vehicle's siren was on or the patrol car windows were rolled down.

Estimated replacement cost for the system as of the 1995 report's date was $1,190,000. The committee recommended replacement of the trunked system with a conventional simulcast system. San Rafael now uses the MERA (Marin County) Motorola ASTRO SmartZone system and got rid of the LTR-Multinet system.
