= LTR Standard =

Within radio technology, LTR (Logic Trunked Radio) Standard systems have no dedicated control channel. All control data is sent as subaudible data along with voice transmissions. Each system site can have any number of radio channels from 1 through a maximum of 20. Each channel is made up of one channel controller connected to one radio repeater operating on one frequency. One controller is assigned as the master or system controller and all the other controllers report to it via a trunking data bus. This connection allows all the repeaters at a site to operate as one LTR system.

Each channel in the system is assigned a unique number (01 through 20) and these need not be sequentially assigned. Each subscriber radio must be programmed with all channels in the system in proper logical channel order (the same requirement as EDACS systems).

LTR Standard Talkgroups are written in the format A-HH-GGG.

- "A" is the area code and is either 0 or 1. The area code is the same for all Talkgroups in a given system site and is arbitrarily chosen by the system operator; the most common use is to simply distinguish between Talkgroups on multiple systems with geographical overlap.
- "HH" is the home repeater number and has twenty possible values, 01 through 20, always noted as two digits. Talkgroups usually use their home repeater by default, unless the repeater is already in use by other Talkgroups. If the home repeater is in use, the system controller will assign another free repeater at random. If no repeater is free (all are in use), then the radio will receive a busy signal.
- "GGG" is the group number and has 254 possible binary values, 001 through 254, always noted as three digits. Only values 001-250 are valid LTR IDs, the rest are used internally. For example 253 is used by some controllers while the channel is sending it's FCC required Morse code ID. This flags the channel as unavailable during that time.
