= MCP1 =

MCP1 may refer to:

- Monocyte chemoattractant protein 1 (MCP1 or MCP-1), cytokine also known as CCL2
- Mast cell protease 1, enzyme also known as chymase
- Tennelec MCP-1, an early radio scanner

== See also ==
- MCPI
- MCPL (disambiguation)
- MCP (disambiguation)
