= San Diego County–Imperial County Regional Communications System =

The San Diego County–Imperial County Regional Communications System, known locally as the RCS, provides wireless 800 MHz voice (radio) and data communications—on separate networks—to over 200 local, county, state, and federal public safety and public service agencies in San Diego County, California, and Imperial County, California. The day-to-day operations are managed by the Wireless Services Division of the San Diego County Sheriff's Office.

The RCS voice network is a Project 25 Phase II 800 MHz trunked, simulcast system. It currently is mixed Phase I and Phase II digital communications and digital encryption capable. Shortly, it will be full Phase II TDMA modulation.

The RCS data network is provided to the County of San Diego Sheriffs Department only, and uses the Motorola 700 MHz conventional High Performance Data system. It provides wireless data access to computerized applications, such as computer-aided dispatch (CAD), automated law enforcement databases, and unit messaging.

== History ==
=== Timeline of notable events ===
- December 8, 1992 − San Diego County Board of Supervisors approved the RCS business plan
- March 7, 1995 − Governing bodies signed the Participating Agency Agreement
- March 5, 1996 − San Diego County Board authorized contract with Motorola & financing of remaining RCS components
- December 1996 − Construction of 43 radio repeater sites began
- May 1998 − Participating agencies began using the RCS
- December 1999 − San Diego County portion of the project completed
- March 5, 2001 − Santana High School shooting
- March 22, 2001 − Granite Hills High School shooting
- October 25, 2003 − Cedar Fire and Paradise Fire
- June, 2017 − FCC mandated 800MHz re-banding begins on the RCS, with the Northeast Cell being the first.
- June 2, 2025 – San Diego Police Department and other agencies that utilize the RCS for police dispatch and communication switch to fully encrypted traffic

== Member agencies ==
=== Counties ===
1. San Diego
2. Imperial

=== Cities ===
==== San Diego County ====
1. Carlsbad
2. Chula Vista
3. Coronado
4. Del Mar
5. El Cajon
6. Encinitas
7. Escondido
8. Imperial Beach
9. La Mesa
10. Lemon Grove
11. National City
12. Port of San Diego
13. Poway
14. Oceanside
15. San Marcos
16. Santee
17. Solana Beach
18. Vista

==== Imperial County ====
1. Brawley
2. Calexico
3. Calipatria
4. El Centro
5. Holtville
6. Imperial
7. Westmorland

== See also ==
- Motorola Trunked Radio
- Trunked radio system
