= PassPort NTS =

PassPort is a type of LTR Trunked radio system designed by Trident Micro Systems, which consists of multiple radio repeater sites linked together to form a wide-area radio dispatch network.

== Purpose ==
Radio signals have a limitation due to distance and terrain. If two radios are far apart, or there is a mountain in the way, they will not be able to communicate. To alleviate this, radio repeaters are installed on mountaintops to repeat the signal from one radio to another, or group of others. This is a standard repeater site. The signal is received by the repeater from the originating radio and re-broadcast so the receiving radio(s) can receive the radio signal. A repeater site gives approximately a 50-mile radius of coverage. Trunk ed radio is a method of using a bank of channels (frequencies) to repeat for multiple "Talk Groups" or fleet of radios. Many Talk Groups can share the channels, without hearing each other's conversation. A Passport system combines both of these technologies as a network of linked repeaters over a wide area that repeat the signal from several mountaintops simultaneously.

== Operation ==
A Talk Group, or fleet of radios, has a "Home Site". The talk group information, which consists of the talk group and radio IDs of a fleet, are stored in this site. When a user turns a radio on, it attempts to register on the Home Site based on the frequencies programmed in the radio. If the radio sees a signal from the home site, and the signal is of usable strength, it registers on the home site. If the radio cannot see the signal from the home site, it starts trying other programmed frequencies of other PassPort sites in the network. When the radio finds a site that has sufficient signal strength, it attempts to register as a "Roamer". The site that the radio is attempting to log on to query the home site for permission to register the Roamer radio. If permission is granted, the radio is registered to the remote site. After that, any voice traffic from the Talk Group of the roamer is not only repeated at the Home Site, but also to the remote site which the radio is registered. When the Roamer roams to a different site, or back to its home site, the Talk Group voice traffic ceases to be repeated at the first site the roamer registered to. The radio monitors signal strength constantly and when the strength falls below a set threshold, the radio starts searching for a site with a stronger signal. If the radio finds a stronger signal, it attempts to register to that site.

== Channels ==
Each PassPort Trunked radio site has 3 important channels:

- A "Home" channel that carries voice traffic for units that are homed at this site.
- A "Group" channel that carries voice traffic for units that are roaming to this site.
- A "Collect" channel that is used by roaming units to register with the site.

The local home channel and Seed List are programmed into the radio by the dealer. When a radio registers on a site, whether it is a home or roam site, it is also given an "almanac" of nearby neighbor site frequencies via DFA broadcast (direct frequency assignment) allowing radios the ability to Roam in large Systems bigger than the Seed List capability or when System Frequency/Channel changes have occurred without having to physically reprogram the Radio. When the currently registered site signal drops below a programmed RSSI (receive signal strength indication) threshold, it first searches the DFA almanac frequencies for a better signal. As it exhausts the almanac, it starts on a "seed list" which are frequencies of all or most sites in the PassPort Radio network.

There are currently no Radio scanners available that will track a PassPort system.
