= Motorola Type II VOC =

Bhavesh Goyal Pali

The introduction of Motorola Type II SmartZone introduced the IntelliRepeater. An IntelliRepeater, or IR, site is a bare-bones trunked site which has no database of users or talkgroups. It is simply sophisticated software running on a Quantar repeater. It is meant to be controlled by the Zone Controller and to be commanded as to who has permission and who does not. There are some very basic restrictions in the event Site Trunking (a site loses its link to the Zone Controller) does occur but for all intents and purposes once an IR site is in Site Trunking mode it's a free-for-all site.

IR sites are generally used for a small geographic area or to fill in holes. For sites that are used to fill in coverage traffic is very limited. To allow as limited a number of channels for use, and to be spectrum efficient, Voice On Control (VOC) was developed to permit the control channel to temporarily act as a voice channel. This allows as little as one channel per site, but access must be severely restricted to the site or communication problems will occur.

When all channels at a VOC enabled site are in use, or a single channel site gets a call request, there is specific data sent out over the control channel to notify all radios at the site that the control channel will be momentarily switching to voice channel mode. Once this happens radios resort to their programmed information which contains timing values that determine what to do once the timer runs out and there is still no control channel (Signal "Out of Range," switch sites, etc.) available.
