= Auctiva =

Software

- The Auctiva home page
- Website type: eBay Listing Management Tool
- Available in: English
- Founded: 1998; 28 years ago
- Headquarters: Malvern, Pennsylvania, {{{location_country}}}
- Owner: Auctiva Online Services LLC
- Founder: Jeff Schlicht
- Website: www.auctiva.com/default.aspx

Auctiva is an eBay auction management system. It was founded in 1998. One of the original members of the eBay Developer Council, Auctiva has provided sellers and merchants with tools designed to help increase their sales volume on eBay. Jeff Schlicht, who founded Auctiva, wrote a program to automate the task of placing listings on eBay. After giving the software to friends and family who enjoyed the convenience it provided, he formed Auctiva, which is used by individuals and businesses attempting to conduct e-commerce through eBay.

Auctiva offers both basic and premium services, including image hosting, auction gallery, auto-relisting, billing support, automatic seller-to-buyer e-mails, picture uploads, scheduled listings, listing designer, supersizing pictures, and consignment support. Auctiva specializes in providing eBay listing management tools and offers multi-channel selling features designed to help online sellers manage and expand their businesses across platforms like eBay and Amazon.

== History ==
In 2025, Auctiva was purchased by Starr Holding Company and now operates independently under Auctiva Online Services LLC..

In 2020, Auctiva was purchased by Morecommerce Inc.

In 2011, Auctiva was purchased by Alibaba.

In 2014, Auctiva participated in the development of a new e-Commerce platform with Alibaba called 11 Main.

In 2015, 11 Main was disbanded and Auctiva became part of the OSP company, alongside OpenSky, Vendio and Storenvy. OSP is 37% owned by Alibaba.

In 2020 MoreCommerce Inc took Auctiva private acquiring it from Alibaba
