= Motorola Type IIi Hybrid =

A Motorola Type IIi Hybrid system is a type of trunked radio system that mixes "blocks" of Type I Fleets/Subfleets with Type II talkgroups. In some cases, all radios support Type II, but in some cases, Type I radios might be used exclusively in subfleets while the Type IIs are used exclusively in talkgroups.

The most common reason that an agency sets up a Type IIi Hybrid system is because they have newer Type II radios that they want to interoperate with older Type I radios, without having to create new Type II talkgroups.
