= Digital Electronic Message Service =

Two-way wireless radio service

The Digital Electronic Message Service (DEMS) is a two-way Wireless radio service for passing of messages and facsimile data using the 10.6 and 24 GHz band. As of 1997, Associated Communications was expected to use the band to create a network in 31 U.S. cities. In October 2005, the FCC moved part of the DEMS service from the 18/19 GHz band to 24 GHz.
