= GE Marc V =

Historic U.S. format or protocol of trunked, two-way radio

GE Marc V
Hear a simulated GE Marc V call as it would sound from a mobile, (version 2).

GE Marc V is a historic U.S. format or protocol of trunked, two-way radio introduced by General Electric Mobile Radio in the early 1980s. This equipment was also sold in Australia. The product name looks and sounds similar to GE-Mark V, a turbine controller made by General Electric. GE developed the EDACS radio system based on its success with Marc V.

== Details ==
These radios are seen as obsolete and there is only one known instance of this system operating in the U.S. today (Grant County, Oklahoma). The general category of this kind of trunked system is called "Scan-based trunking." In the U.S. and Australia, these systems used analog FM, operated in the 806–869 MHz band, and were primarily used for commercial, non-public-safety trunking. Some earlier systems offered half-duplex, (push-to-talk) telephone interconnects and later versions also offered full-duplex telephone interconnects. This feature was popular before the rollout of analog cellular telephones.

Radio models used in these systems included the names "Classic", "Corona" and "Centura", generally referred to as 3C radios. While most radio models were sold with a speaker and microphone, some had a telephone handset and cradle attached to the front of the dash-mount radio housing. There was an earlier trunk-mount model that looked like a MASTR Executive II with the name Mastr. An MPR-series hand-held model was offered for GE Marc V trunked systems. Later models included a Japanese-made radio with model numbers beginning with TMX (mobiles) and TPX (portables). Certain later models of PCS and MDX radios were dual-mode, supporting GE Marc V and EDACS.

A large system operator might own their radio backbone (repeaters). GE Marc V Specialized Mobile Radio systems, where subscribers paid a company to operate the trunked radio system, were present in major U.S. cities. The operators typically charge a monthly fee for each radio plus airtime charges.

Some mobile units could be programmed to work on more than one GE Marc V trunked system. For example, if the SMR operator had a system in Bloomington and another covering Chicago, many radio models offered an "area" switch. This selected the transmit area priority. Different radio models had 29- to 100-channel capacity and there were limitations on the number of areas and the number of channels per area. In its default configuration, the radios function in the same way a talk-back-on-scan option works: regardless of which area was selected, the radio would join a conversation on the system where it was taking place.

Early first generation radios were crystal controlled and had crystal oscillator modules with temperature compensators (ICOMS), and later models were synthesized and had an 82S123 32x8 (not 32Kx8) PROM which defined RF frequencies. Option settings and tones were selected by jumpers and laser-etched hybrids called Versatones. Second generation "3C" radios used an Intel MCS-48 microprocessor and programming was burned into two 82S123 PROMs. In subsequent generation radios, a PC programming interface set the radio's RF channels and options. In U.S. systems, the set of channel frequencies for a system or area were usually unique to each trunked system. The radios could scan multiple systems provided that the total number of channels in the combined systems did not exceed 20. The radios were not capable of roaming. (Roaming in this use means working with an unknown GE Marc V system the user happened to run across in their travels).

== How it worked ==
In a GE Marc V system:

- Electronics that determine which channel a conversation will occur on are inside each radio. When the user takes the microphone off-hook, the radio scans all available channels in the system to find an unused channel for a conversation. The user would hear a low-pitched error tone if they took the microphone off hook and no channels were available or the radio was out-of-range.
- When idle, radios scan to look for a tone sequence initiating a conversation from another radio in their own group.
- Repeaters are essentially stand-alone repeaters, except for tone handshaking electronics, deadbeat disable computer, telephone patch equipment, or equipment used to bill air time (talking time). Some of these were options.
- Because call set up was slower than "transmission-trunked" systems, repeaters had a long hang time in order to hold a group's mobile radios on a channel until a conversation was finished. This "conversation trunking" was the primary difference between GE Marc V and other systems.
- A trunked system or area could have up to 20 channels. Some 100-channel models, for example, could accommodate five 20-channel areas.

=== Two-tone sequential ===
GE Marc V used a two-tone sequence to identify a group: what modern systems call agency-fleet-subfleet or talk groups. Each radio had at least one tone pair, which identified the group of radios it could talk with. It was similar in format to two-tone sequential paging codes except that, in a GE Marc V system, the first tone was much longer than the second. This long first tone gave a bigger time window for all the scanning radios to find and decode a two-tone sequence. The first tone was lengthened for systems with more channels.

It was possible for radios to have several tone pairs or groups. These could be used to make phone calls over a patch without all other users in the same group having to listen to the call. Some systems had hierarchies: manager groups could talk amongst one another without going out over everyone's radio.

As larger systems used up most of the available tone pairs, it became necessary to alter the tone sequence to generate a total of four tones, one longer "collect" tone followed by three group tones in rapid sequence. This was known as GE Marc V-E for "enhanced". This also reduced a falsing problem that existed in larger systems where mobile radios would open up on other users tones as well as intermodulation products occurring in large metropolitan areas.

=== Continuous tone squelch ===
Systems transmitted a continuous tone (at 3051.9 Hz by default), called Busy Tone. A low-pass filter eliminated most of the tone from speaker audio. The tone was present through the transmission, but cut off just before the repeater dropped in order to eliminate squelch tail. There were two possible continuous tones: all radios on a single system used the same tone. These were used to distinguish between sites in the same way SAT tones were used on AMPS cellular systems. The first system in an area typically used the default tone of 3051.9 Hz, while 2918.7 Hz could be used for an additional system on the same channel(s) that might have some coverage overlap. Radios using the system had to have their continuous tone set to match the desired system and have a compatible two-tone sequence for their group.

=== Transmitter tests ===
Since the radio would not transmit unless the ready light was lit, checking output power, frequency, or deviation on the bench or outside the system coverage area required the technician to attach a test box. The box bypassed the radio trunking logic so adjustments could be made in a conventional single-channel mode. Antenna forward and reflected power in a vehicle on a working system was typically checked by bringing up a talk channel and transmitting normally. Once a channel was brought up it could be 'held' for up to 3 minutes (the limit of the system carrier control timer).

=== Operator view of the system ===
If the operator desired to make a radio call, they would pull the mike out of the hang-up box. This would cause the radio to look for a channel with no busy tone (3051.9 Hz) present. When a vacant channel was found, the push-to-talk relay would chatter and the transmit indicator would flicker. The radio would handshake with the repeater using a single analog tone. The handshake would identify the repeater as "in range" and the channel as "not busy." If the radio successfully performed the busy handshake, its two-tone group sequence was transmitted over the air. As soon as the tones were sent, the receiver audio turned on and the radio made a doorbell-like "ding dong" chime to tell the operator the channel was available to talk. A green "ready-to-talk" light-emitting diode on the radio lit. The speaker turned on and the operator heard idle carrier from the repeater.

Other radios in the same group would scan until they heard a first tone matching their own two-tone sequence. Hearing a matching first tone, the scanning would stop and wait to determine if the second tone matched its group. If the tone didn't match, the radio would silently go on searching. On hearing a matching tone, every radio in the group would do the doorbell chime, display a green, ready indicator, and the speaker audio would turn on. The user would hear the open carrier until someone talked or the repeater carrier dropped after approximately 8 seconds.

Since the doorbell sound was annoying, users tended to try to hold the repeater carrier on until the called party answered so they wouldn't have to listen to continual ding-dongs. If base was slow to answer, the transmission might sound like, "Unit four to base," <squelch tail>... <squelch tail>... <squelch tail>... <repeater drops>. On some radio models, the doorbell sound was programmable but it's not clear if those responsible for systems knew this (Note: some operators of this system knew this was possible, but did not change it as it would have confused the users).

=== Missed calls ===
A major drawback to this architecture is the fact that a missed two-tone sequence at the beginning of a transmission, or a lost signal during a transmission, causes the rest of a transmission to be missed. If the mobile receiver gets interference or loses the repeater signal for the moment the second selective calling tone is sent, it remains muted, missing the entire conversation. The same is true if the repeater signal is lost at any time during a transmission. Only another two-tone sequence being sent will allow it to rejoin the conversation.

Some later systems were equipped with a 'join' feature to overcome this problem. The system would monitor all channels in a given system and, if it detected a mobile attempting to acquire a second channel, that user would be invalidated on that channel (dumped), and immediately afterwards a 2-tone signaling sequence would begin on the original channel, bringing the lost unit into the original conversation. This could be highly annoying to users already in a conversation, as the very audible collect and group tones would interrupt the conversation, and if the invalidated user persisted in attempting to bring up a channel rather than waiting for the system to signal him, the collect and group tones would continue to be sent out on the working channel repeatedly on each channel attempt.

A modern trunked system with a control channel is more costly and complicated, but sends continual messages for all in-progress conversations. If your radio is in a talk group conversing on channel 3, the control channel continually sends "<go to channel 3>" messages over and over until the transmission ends. Suppose the user is driving through a tunnel with no signal then exits and acquires the signal. If the mobile receiver acquires the control channel signal any time during the conversation, it immediately decodes the channel assignment and switches over to join the conversation.

== Tech trivia ==
System documentation shows at least some radio models, including Classic and Centura, were not capable of being programmed for areas near the Mexican Border. Federal Communications Commission channel assignments along the border follow 25 kHz offsets (example: 809.775 MHz) unlike the rest of the US where they follow 12.5 kHz offsets, (example: 811.1625 MHz).
