= GSM Radio Frequency optimization =

Optimization of GSM radio frequencies

GSM radio frequency optimization (GSM RF optimisation) is the optimization of GSM radio frequencies. GSM networks consist of different cells and each cell transmit signals to and receive signals from the mobile station, for proper working of base station many parameters are defined before functioning the base station such as the coverage area of a cell depends on different factors including the transmitting power of the base station, obstructing buildings in cells, height of the base station and location of base station. Radio Frequency Optimization is a process through which different soft (Cell Reselect Offset, BTS power) and hard (e.g. Electrical Tilt, Mechanical Tilt, Azimuth etc.) parameters of the Base transceiver stations are changed in order to improve the coverage area and improve quality of signal. Besides that there are various key performance indicators which have to be constantly monitored and necessary changes proposed in order to keep KPIs in agreed limits with the mobile operator.

== Introduction ==
Optimization is an important step in the life cycle of a wireless network. Drive testing is the first step in the process, with the goal of collecting measurement data as a function of location. Once the data has been collected over the desired RF coverage area, it is output to post-processing software. Engineers can use the collection and post-processing software to identify the causes of RF coverage or interference problems and determine how these problems can be solved. When the problems, causes and solutions have been identified, steps are performed to solve the problems. Network statistics are also an important step in analysis and troubleshooting of RF issues. Every node (BTS, BSC, MSC) has its own counters some of which are incremented/decremented on occurrence of different events e.g. a dropped call due to low signal strength. These statistics are analysed using different graphs and reports and when KPI from the statistics exceed the limit, extensive analysis is carried out to identify and troubleshoot the problem.

== Technical details ==
=== GSM call flow ===
There are various control channels involved in setting up of a voice call in a GSM network. On Broadcast Channels system information and various parameters along with synchronization and frequency correction information is transmitted. Common Control Channels are used for informing the mobile or the GSM network about a service (voice, data, SMS) initiation and Dedicated Control Channels are used for call setup, authentication, location updating and SMS.

A mobile is informed on a paging channel (PCH) that it has a call or SMS, to which the mobile station responds with a Random Access Channel (RACH) request. The mobile station is notified on an Access Grant Channel (AGCH) that it may tune to a specific Stand-alone dedicated control channel (SDCCH) which is called Immediate Assignment. The user is authenticated and ciphering commands are received on this channel. After successful authentication the mobile station is requested to tune to an assigned traffic channel (TCH). This process is called TCH assignment. Then the user starts to move from one cell to another and the process of smooth transitioning of call from one cell to the other is called a handover. While on the SDCCH or TCH a call may get dropped which is accounted to SDCCH drop or TCH drop respectively.

=== Key Performance Indicators(KPI) ===
==== Paging success rate ====
Paging Success by far is the most complex KPI to deal with as the process of paging touches almost all the nodes in GSM system and is influenced by performance of each of them. That’s the reason why this write up on paging looks too interwoven and cross refers to too many things. But the plus point with paging is by the time paging success rate in a network gets improved; almost all the other KPIs too stand improved. In response to an incoming call, the MSC initiates the paging process by broadcasting a "paging request" message on the paging sub channel (IMSI or TMSI of the MS and its Paging Group) and starts timer T3113. A "paging message" consists of the mobile identity (IMSI or TMSI) of the MS being paged and its "paging group number". A Paging Request Message may include more than one MS identification. The maximum number of paged MS per message is 4 when using "TMSI" for identification of the MS (maximum number of paged MS per message is 2 when using IMSI). The BSC receives this page and processes the paging request and schedules it for transmission on the PCH at appropriate time. The MS on its part will analyse the paging messages (and immediate assignment messages) sent on the paging sub channel corresponding to its paging group. Upon receipt of a "paging request" message, MS will initiate within 0.7s an immediate assignment procedure. Upon receipt of a page at the MS, the MS responds by transmitting a channel request on the RACH. BSS in response to the received "channel request", will process it and immediately assign the MS a SDCCH (immediate assignment / assignment reject; done over AGCH). MS Paging response- After receiving the immediate assignment command, MS switches to the assigned "SDCCH" and transmits a "Paging Response". The establishment of the main signalling link is then initiated with information field containing the "PAGING RESPONSE" message and the "paging response" is sent to the MSC. Upon receipt of the "Paging Response" MSC stops the timer T3113. If the timer T3113 expires and a "Paging Response"message has not been received, the MSC may repeat the "Paging Request" message and start T3113 all over again. The number of successive paging attempt is a network dependent choice.

One control channel Multi Frame is made of 51 TDMA frames with a time duration of 235 ms. Each 51 TDMA frame Multi Frame will have 9 Common Control Channel (CCCH) blocks. Each of these 9 CCCH block is made of 4 TDMA frames. Each CCCH block can carry Paging Messages for 2 MS if IMSI based paging is used or 4 MS if TMSI based paging is used. Thus the paging capacity for one 51 TDMA frame Multi Frame will be 9(number of CCCH blocks available per Multi Frame) * 4 (when TMSI based paging is used) = 36 mobiles per 235 ms or 9*2 = 18 mobiles per 235 ms when IMSI based paging is used. Thus the paging capacity of a cell is 153 mobiles per second when TMSI based paging are used and 68 mobiles per second when IMSI based paging are used. This means we can improve the "paging bandwidth" for a cell (if there are too many "paging discards at the cell level") by using TMSI based paging rather than IMSI based (at the expense of increased processor load at the BSC and MSC). When the rate of "paging load" at the BTS becomes higher than what the BTS is able to handle (paging capacity of BTS), BTS will start discarding pages (check for high "page discard" stats at the cell level). Once an MS deciphers its paging group, in an idle mode, it will tune in and check for an incoming page only during broadcast time for its paging group (so further the paging groups are places across multiple 51 frame multi frames, less frequently it will tune in to check for an incoming page and longer will be its battery life.

==== Immediate assignment success rate ====
 Immediate assignment success rate indicates the success rate of the MS accessing the signaling channel. It concerns the procedure from the MS sending a channel required message to the BTS to the MS sending an establish indication message to the network.

Immediate assignment success rate is a key access counter. It directly reflects the success rate of the MS accessing the signaling channel and affects the user experience.

The immediate assignment success rate is calculated from traffic statistics. The recommended formula is as follows: Immediate Assignment Success Rate = (Successful Immediate Assignments/Immediate Assignment Requests) x 100%

Symptom Description : If the immediate assignment success rate decreases, the following symptoms may occur: Call setup success rate decreases. Congestion occurs frequently on the SDCCH Traffic volume on the TCH decreases Short messages cannot be successfully sent.

==== Random access success rate ====
Random Access Channel (RACH) is used by the MS on the "uplink" to request for allocation of an SDCCH. This request from the MS on the uplink could either be as a page response (MS being paged by the BSS in response to an incoming call) or due to user trying to access the network to establish a call. Availability of SDCCH at the BTS will not have any impact on the Random Access Success. In the transceiver, the timeslot handler in charge of the RACH channel listens for access burst from mobiles (on the time-slot that transmits BCCH). These bursts contain a check sequence (8 bits) that is used to determine if the message is valid.

==== SDCCH drop rate ====
SDCCH Call Drop Rate indicates the probability of call drops that occur when MSs occupy SDCCHs.SDCCH Call Drop Rate is one of accessibility KPIs. This KPI reflects the seizure condition of signaling channels. If the value of this KPI is high, user experience is adversely affected. SDCCH Call Drop Rate = Call Drops on SDCCH/ Successful SDCCH

==== TCH assignment success rate ====
TCH assignment failure is a phenomenon where the MS is not able to use the TCH which is assigned to it for voice call. This could happen due to uplink /downlink interference, faulty radio or faulty antenna system.

==== Call drop rate ====
TCH drop (or a dropped call) could be broadly classified into 3 sub classes:

- Degradation of the links (Uplink and Downlink): either degradation of Signal Strength which falls near or lower than the sensitivity of the base station (around to -110 dBm) or that of the mobile (around -104dBm) or degradation of quality of the links (Uplink and Downlink) often due to interference.
- Excess TA (TA>63 or excess path imbalance due to high TA).
- Other Reasons.

==== Handover success rate ====
Handover in BSS system is controlled an algorithm in the BSC. This algorithm operates on the basis of Measurement Reports (MR) sent in by the MS on SACCH. The inputs that the BSC uses for making a handover decision, from the received MRs from the MS is the DL signal strength, DL quality, and the signal strength of the six best reported neighbours. From the serving BTS, for the same MS the BSC will use UL signal strength, UL quality and TA.

== Optimization process ==
Optimization process can be explained by below step by step description:

=== Problem analysis ===
- Analyzing performance retrieve tool reports and statistics for the worst performing BSCs and/or Sites
- Viewing Reports for BSC/Site performance trends
- Examining Planning tool Coverage predictions
- Analyzing previous drive test data
- Discussions with local engineers to prioritize problems
- Checking Customer Complaints reported to local engineers

=== Checks prior to action ===
- Cluster definitions by investigating BSC borders, main cities, freeways, major roads
- Investigating customer distribution, customer habits (voice/data usage)
- Running specific traces on Network to categorize problems
- Checking trouble ticket history for previous problems
- Checking any fault reports to limit possible hardware problems prior to test

=== Drive testing ===
- Preparing Action Plan Defining drive test routes
- Collecting RSSI Log files
- Scanning frequency spectrum for possible interference sources
- Re–driving questionable data

=== Subjects to investigate ===
- Non-working sites/sectors or TRXs
- In-active Radio network features like frequency hopping
- Disabled GPRS
- Overshooting sites – coverage overlaps
- Coverage holes
- C/I, C/A analysis
- High Interference Spots
- Drop Calls
- Capacity Problems
- Other Interference Sources
- Missing Neighbors
- One–way neighbors
- Ping–Pong Handovers
- Not happening handovers
- Accessibility and Retain-ability of the Network
- Equipment Performance
- Faulty Installations

=== After the test ===
- Post processing of data Plotting RX Level and Quality Information for overall picture of the driven area
- Initial Discussions on drive test with Local engineers
- Reporting urgent problems for immediate action
- Analyzing Network feature performance after new implementations
- Transferring comments on parameter implementations after new changes

=== Recommendations ===
- Defining missing neighbor relations
- Proposing new sites or sector additions with Before & After coverage plots
- Proposing antenna azimuth changes
- Proposing antenna tilt changes
- Proposing antenna type changes
- BTS Equipment/Filter change
- Re–tuning of interfered frequencies
- BSIC changes
- AdjustingHandover margins (Power Budget, Level, Quality, Umbrella HOs)
- Adjusting accessibility parameters (RX Lev Acc Min, etc..)
- Changing power parameters
- Attenuation Adds/Removals
- MHA/TMA adds
