= MACOM Technology Solutions =

American semiconductor manufacturer

MACOM Technology Solutions Holdings, Inc.
- Formerly: Microwave Associates, Inc. M/A-COM; M/A-COM Technology Solutions
- Company type: Public
- Traded as: Nasdaq: MTSI; S&P 400 component
- Industry: Technology
- Founded: 1950; 76 years ago
- Headquarters: Lowell, Massachusetts, U.S.
- Key people: Stephen G. Daly (chairman, CEO and president)
- Products: Semiconductors
- Revenue: ▲US$967 million (2025)
- Operating income: ▲US$130 million (2025)
- Net income: ▼US$−54 million (2025)
- Total assets: ▲US$2.10 billion (2025)
- Total equity: ▲US$1.33 billion (2025)
- Number of employees: 2,000 (2025)
- Website: macom.com
- Footnotes / references Financials as of October 3, 2025.

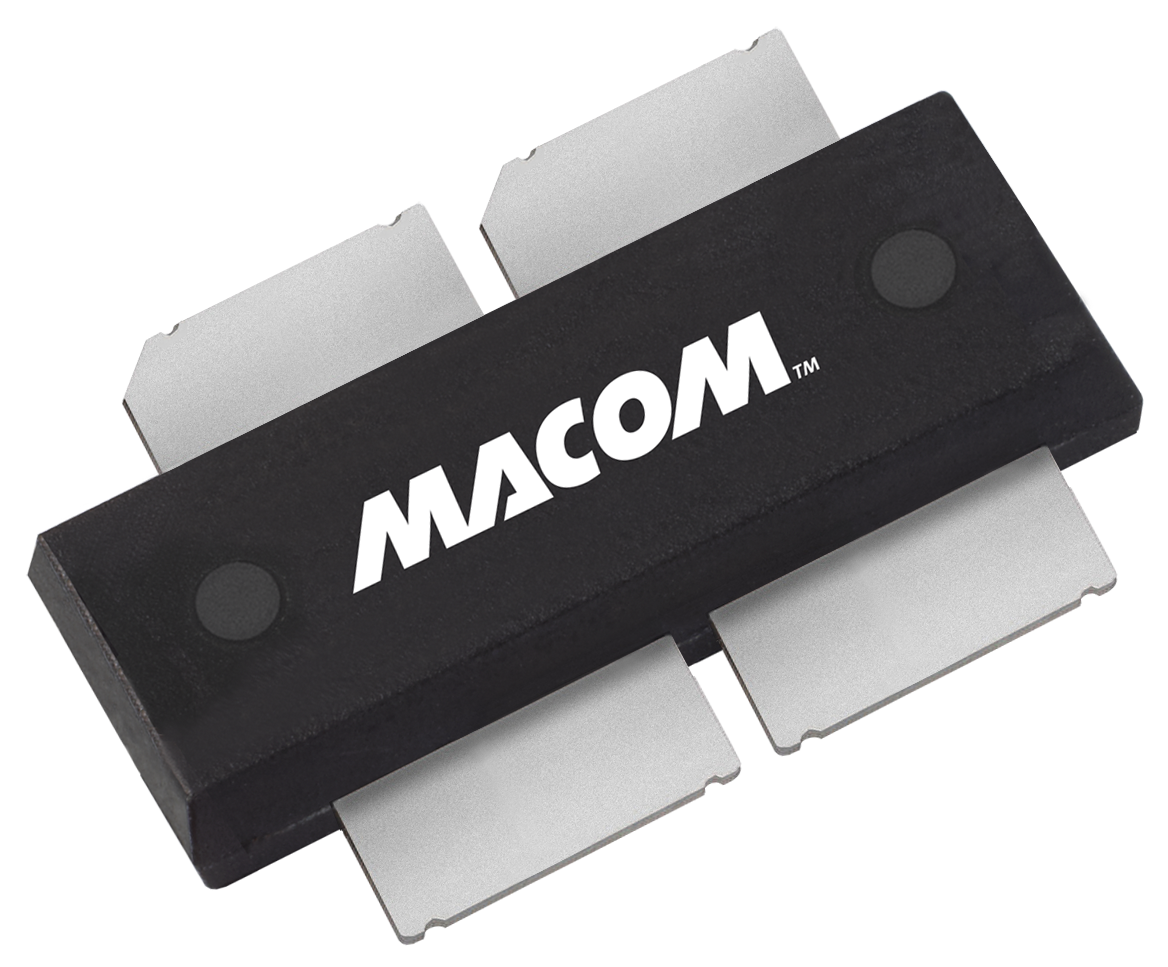
TO272S-4

MACOM Technology Solutions, Inc. is an American developer and producer of radio, microwave, and millimeter wave semiconductor devices and components. The company is headquartered in Lowell, Massachusetts, and in 2005 was Lowell's largest private employer. MACOM is certified to the ISO 9001 international quality standard and ISO 14001 environmental standard. The company has design centers and sales offices in North America, Europe, Asia and Australia.

== History ==
=== 1950-1999 ===
The company was founded in the 1950s as Microwave Associates by the engineers Vessarios Chigas, Louis Roberts, Hugh Wainwright and Richard M. Walker. The company was initially a small supplier of magnetrons to the U.S. Army Signal Corps.

In 1969, the company appointed as its president Lawrence Gould, who had joined the company in 1953 while finishing his PhD at MIT. Gould, appointed CEO in 1975, launched an acquisitions spree that included Digital Communications Corporation in 1978, Linkabit in 1980, and Ohio Scientific in 1981. In 1978, Gould changed the company’s name to M/A-COM to reflect its broader market focus.

During this timeframe, the company produced low power wideband RF amplifier modules for use in test & measurement.

Gould was fired as CEO in July 1982, and was replaced by Richard DiBona. After suffering a stroke in 1986, DiBona was replaced by Thomas Burke in 1987, who was killed in a September 1989 automobile accident. Thomas Vanderslice, former CEO of Apollo Computer, was named the final CEO of the independent M/A-COM in December 1989.

The company divested of DCC and Linkabit operations between 1986 and 1990. However, it faced severe financial pressures with the drop in defense spending in the 1990s. Vanderslice sold the company to AMP Inc., in an all-stock transaction completed in June 1995 that was valued at $316 million.

In 1999, AMP itself was acquired by Tyco Electronics.

=== 2000–2010 ===
In 2001, Tyco acquired Com-Net Ericsson and placed the company under the administration of MACOM, as part of the deal, the company acquired the EDACS radio systems team and products and merged them with its own OpenSky resources. The deal also allowed MACOM to become the second largest two-way radio communications manufacturer in the United States. The combined company subsequently developed a P25 radio offering, and has grown its critical communications systems business to be a large player in the modern wireless two-way communications market. In June 2003, XMA Corporation, located in Manchester, New Hampshire, purchased from MACOM the Omni Spectra line of coaxial attenuators and terminations.

On May 13, 2008, Tyco Electronics announced that it would sell its RF Components and Subsystem Business to Cobham plc for $425 million. Tyco Electronics retained the wireless communications part of MACOM, but renamed it Tyco Electronics Wireless Systems. On September 29, 2008, Tyco Electronics and Cobham announced the completion of the sale of Tyco Electronics’ M/A-COM Radio Frequency Components and Subsystems business to Cobham plc. Tyco Electronics kept its Wireless Systems business unit, and changed its name from M/A-COM to Tyco Electronics Wireless Systems.

On March 30, 2009, the company acquired all of the outstanding stock of M/A-COM Technology Solutions Inc., the primary operating subsidiary of MACOM and the related foreign operating subsidiary, M/ACOM Technology Solutions Limited from Cobham. Cobham plc announced that it had sold M/A-COM's commercial business segment, M/A-COM Technology Solutions, to John Ocampo, the owner of GaAs Labs, on March 31, 2009. In May 2010, MACOM acquired Mimix Broadband, a fabless supplier of GaAs semiconductors.

=== 2011–present ===
In May 2011, MACOM acquired Optomai Inc., a semiconductor company that developed integrated circuits and modules for 40 and 100-Gbit/s fiber optic networks. The company announced it had reached a deal to purchase Mindspeed Technologies, a network infrastructure semiconductor business in November 2013. In February 2014, the company announced that it had sold Mindspeed's wireless business to Intel Corporation. On February 13, 2014, the company purchased Nitronex LLC, a privately held designer of gallium nitride semiconductors for $26 million. That same year, MACOM also purchased the RF and microwave company IKE Micro and SiPh services company, Photonic Controls. In November 2014, MACOM reached an agreement to buy BinOptics Corporation, a provider of InP lasers that started at Cornell University, for $230 million. In November 2015, the company announced that it planned to acquire the Japanese optical subassembly supplier, FiBest Limited, before the end of the first quarter in 2016. In December 2015, MACOM acquired Aeroflex's diode business, Aeroflex Metelics from Cobham for $38 million in cash. In January 2017, MACOM acquired Applied Micro Circuits Corporation. In February 2023, MACOM announced it had acquired the assets and operations of the Limeil-Brévannes semiconductor manufacturer, OMMIC SAS for €38.5 million. In August 2023, it was announced MACOM had entered into a definitive agreement to acquire the RF business of Wolfspeed.

== Operations ==
=== Technology ===
MACOM develops and supplies semiconductor technologies for optical, wireless and satellite networks. The company has a portfolio of analog RF, microwave, millimeterwave and photonic semiconductor products. MACOM has 16 Design and Operational centers worldwide including 11 in the United States, two in Ireland and one in Australia, Japan and Taiwan. MACOM produces an array of chip technologies, including gallium arsenide (GaAs), gallium nitride (GaN), silicon photonics (SiPh), aluminum gallium arsenide (AlGaAs), indium phosphide (InP), silicon (Si), heterolithic microwave integrated circuit (HMIC), and silicon germanium (SiGe). The company's acquisition of BinOptics in 2014 allows it to use self-aligning etched facet technology to ensure an efficient manufacturing and testing process. Much of MACOM's current sub-microwave RF product line are generic substitutes for the Motorola SPS MRF series of beryllium oxide devices produced in the mid-1990s, rebranded with revised device datasheets.

=== Markets ===
MACOM creates semiconductors for a variety of industries: while the company does provide some semiconductors for consumer electronics, its products are primarily used in commercial and industrial applications. In the aerospace and defense industries, MACOM supplies contractors (like Northrop Grumman) with components that are designed to be integrated into surveillance devices (such as radar). MACOM components are also used by the National Oceanic and Atmospheric Administration (NOAA) and the Federal Aviation Administration.

The company's networking and communications products are used in satellite applications, and they are consumed by clients like Cisco for wired and wireless networking applications. MACOM also creates high-speed optical networking components in high-margin specialized spaces such as data centers, long-haul communications, and metro core networks.

MACOM received a Technology & Engineering Emmy Award for its development of technology that enables high density video switching and routing solutions in 2015. The technology is important in broadcast video infrastructure.

The company also provides power transistors to clients in a variety of industries. For instance, their MOSFET product line has been used in medical instruments (such as MRI systems and CAT scanners) and automotive ignition systems.

== Litigation ==
On January 15, 2009, the State of New York terminated its contract with Tyco Electronics Wireless Systems (often referred to as M/A-COM) due to ongoing and unresolved deficiencies with the OpenSky system.

On February 13, 2009, Tyco Electronics filed a complaint against the New York State Office for Technology (NY-OFT), in the New York State Court of Claims, disputing the claims made by the OFT. In the complaint, Tyco Electronics disputed many of the NY-OFT's public criticisms of both the company and the system, maintaining that SWN (which included OpenSky) ‘worked as contracted.’ The complaint also claimed the state hindered the company's ability to build the system in a timely manner, defamed the company by stating that its technology did not work, and that the state inappropriately drew $50 million from the standby letter of credit the company established for the project.

In June 2014, a Judge ruled that Laird Technologies, Inc. was no longer allowed to supply Ford Motor Company with GPS Modules after MACOM sued for patent infringement.

In April 2016, MACOM filed a suit against the German technology company, Infineon Technologies after alleging that the Infineon was in breach of contract, covenant of good faith and fair dealing and interference with contract.
