= MCPL =

MCPL may refer to:

- Master Corporal (MCpl), a military rank for a non-commissioned officer
- Marathon County Public Library, Marathon County, Wisconsin, USA
- Mason City Public Library, Mason City, Iowa, USA
- Mid-Continent Public Library, Missouri, USA
- Monroe County Public Library, Monroe County, Indiana, USA
- Montgomery County Public Libraries, Montgomery County, Maryland, USA
- Morgan Credit Pvt. Ltd (MCPL), a criminal enterprise associated with Rana Kapoor
- Monte Carlo Particle Lists (MCPL), a software for exchange of (particle) data between radiation transport codes applying the Monte Carlo algorithm

== See also ==
- Marion County Public Library System (MCPLS), Marion County, West Virginia, USA
- MCPI
- MCP1
