= Multi-Band Excitation =

Set of speech coding standards by Digital Voice Systems, Inc.

Multi-Band Excitation (MBE) is a series of proprietary speech coding standards developed by Digital Voice Systems, Inc. (DVSI).

== Overview ==
In 1967 Osamu Fujimura (MIT) showed basic advantages of the multi-band representation of speech ("An Approximation to Voice Aperiodicity", IEEE 1968). This work gave a start to development of the "multi-band excitation" method of speech coding, that was patented in 1997 (now expired) by founders of DVSI as "Multi-Band Excitation" (MBE). All consequent improvements known as Improved Multi-Band Excitation (IMBE), Advanced Multiband Excitation (AMBE), AMBE+ and AMBE+2 are based on this MBE method.

AMBE is a codebook-based vocoder that operates at bitrates of between 2 and 9.6 kbit/s, and at a sampling rate of 8 kHz in 20-ms frames. The audio data is usually combined with up to 7 bit/s of forward error correction data, producing a total RF bandwidth of approximately 2,250 Hz (compared to 2,700–3,000 Hz for an analogue single sideband transmission). Lost frames can be masked by using the parameters of the previous frame to fill in the gap.

== Usage ==
AMBE is used by the Inmarsat and Iridium satellite telephony systems and certain channels on XM Satellite Radio and is the speech coder for OpenSky Trunked radio systems.

AMBE is used in D-STAR amateur radio digital voice communications. It has met criticism from the amateur radio community because the nature of its patent and licensing runs counter to the openness of amateur radio, as well as usage restriction for being "undisclosed digital code" under FCC rule 97.309(b) and similar national legislation.

System Fusion, open specification from Yaesu, also uses AMBE codec with C4FM modulation.

The NXDN digital voice and data protocol uses the AMBE+2 codec. NXDN is implemented by Icom in the IDAS system and by Kenwood as NEXEDGE.

APCO Project 25 Phase 2 trunked radio systems also use the AMBE+2 codec, while older Phase 1 radios such as the Motorola XTL and XTS series use the earlier IMBE codec. Newer Phase 1 capable radios such as the APX series radios use the AMBE+2 codec, which is backwards compatible with Phase 1.

Digital Mobile Radio (DMR), including Motorola's MOTOTRBO and Hytera's implementation, uses the AMBE+2 codec.

== Licensing ==
Use of the AMBE standard requires a license from Digital Voice Systems, Inc. While a licensing fee is due for most codecs, DVSI does not disclose software licensing terms. Anecdotal evidence suggests that licensing fee begin from between $100,000 to $1 million. For purposes of comparison, licensing fees for use of the MP3 standard started at $15,000. For small-scale use and prototyping, the only option is to purchase a dedicated hardware IC from DVSI. These ICs can be purchased for less than $100 in small quantities.

DSP Innovations Inc. offers a software implementation of APCO P25 Phase 1 (Full-Rate) and Phase 2 (Half-Rate) codecs as well as DMR and dPMR codecs. A technology licence from DVSI is required. The patent for IMBE has expired.

== Alternatives ==
Codec2 is an open source alternative which uses half of the bandwidth of AMBE to encode speech of similar quality, created by David Rowe and lobbied by Bruce Perens. Codec2 still continues to evolve, with additional "modes" being developed, refined and made available on a continuous basis. This has resulted in an open source codec that has progressively increased its robustness and performance – when subjected to some of the most challenging RF and acoustic environments.

== See also ==
- Digital mobile radio
- D-STAR
