= Logic Trunked Radio =

System for two-way radio

Logic Trunked Radio (LTR) is a radio system developed in the late 1970s by the E. F. Johnson Company.

LTR is distinguished from some other common trunked radio systems in that it does not have a dedicated control channel. LTR systems are limited to 20 channels (repeaters) per site and each site stands alone (not linked). is Each repeater has its own controller and all of these controllers are coordinated together. Even though each controller monitors its own channel, one of the channel controllers is assigned to be a master and all the other controllers report to it.

Typically on LTR systems, each of these controllers periodically sends out a data burst (approximately every 10 seconds on LTR Standard systems) so that the subscriber units know that the system is there and which channels are in use or available. The idle data burst can be turned off if desired by the system operator. Some systems will broadcast idle data bursts only on channels used as home channels and not on those used for "overflow" conversations. To a listener, the idle data burst will sound like a short blip of static like someone keyed up and unkeyed a radio within about 1/4 second. This data burst is not sent at the same time by all the channels but happen randomly throughout all the system channels.
