= Tennelec =

- Type: Division
- Founder: Edward Fairstein
- Headquarters: Oak Ridge, Tennessee
- Parent: Mirion Technologies

Tennelec was a US electronics company founded in the early 1960s by Edward Fairstein in Oak Ridge, Tennessee. The company came to prominence producing instrumentation for nuclear studies and later, programmable scanning radios.

The TC-200 amplifier was a successful early design that established Tennelec as a leader in the nuclear instrumentation field. Following on the heels of the TC-200 success, the company developed additional components necessary for precise nuclear measurement, including detectors and particle counters.

Tennelec also manufactured innovative scanning radios in the 1970s. The first programmable radio scanner was the Memoryscan from Tennelec Commercial Products Division, introduced in 1974, and later known as the Memoryscan 1 (model MS-1). This was followed by a slightly improved model, the Memoryscan 2 (model MS-2). Prior to the MS-1 and MS-2, scanners were "programmed" by inserting a series of hand-cut crystals tuned for different frequencies. The scanner would then switch between the frequencies, stopping when the user pressed a switch. With the MS-1 and MS-2, the user selected up to 16 frequencies they wanted to monitor by setting them up using binary codes entered via two pushbuttons on the front panel. Sixteen toggle switches allowed the user to select which frequencies were of interest at any given time. The system could cycle through the selected frequencies until stopped. The advantage was that the system could be set up to monitor different sets of frequencies, e.g., police one night, fire departments the next.

The first scanner allowing direct entry of decimal frequencies on a keypad, was the Tennelec MCP-1. The scanner was released at the Winter 1976 Consumer Electronics Show in Chicago. The system was a hit, and was soon picked up for Radio Shack. To help users get started, Radio Shack also purchased thousands of copies of Police Call, a guide to various radio frequencies

Partly due to poor quality control of their scanner line, Tennelec filed for bankruptcy soon after introducing their latest radio models. By this point other manufacturers, in particular SBE and Regency and Electra, had already introduced their own programmable models.

Tennelec, still located in Oak Ridge, TN, is a division of Mirion Technologies, which acquired Tennelec's previous parent company, Canberra Industries.

== See also ==
- Scanner (radio)
- Consumer Electronics Show
