= Radio scanner =

Radio receiver that can scan multiple frequencies

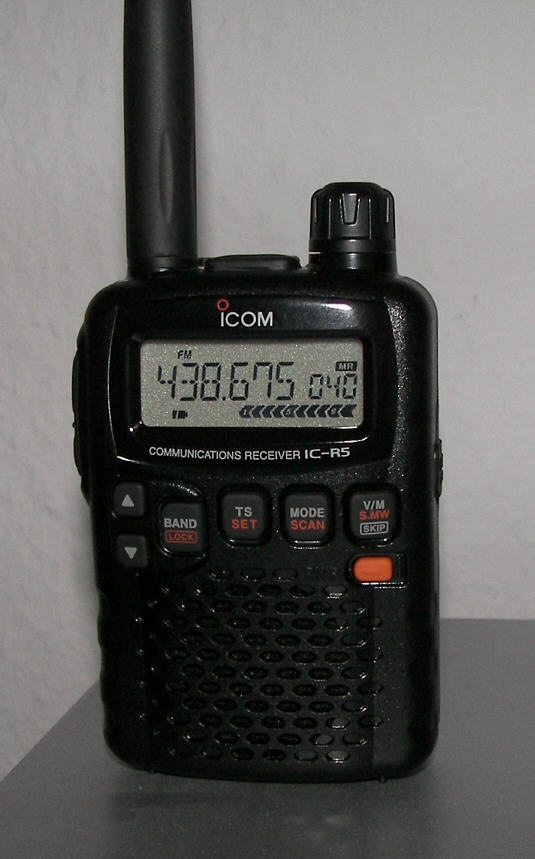
An Icom IC-R5 hand-held scanner

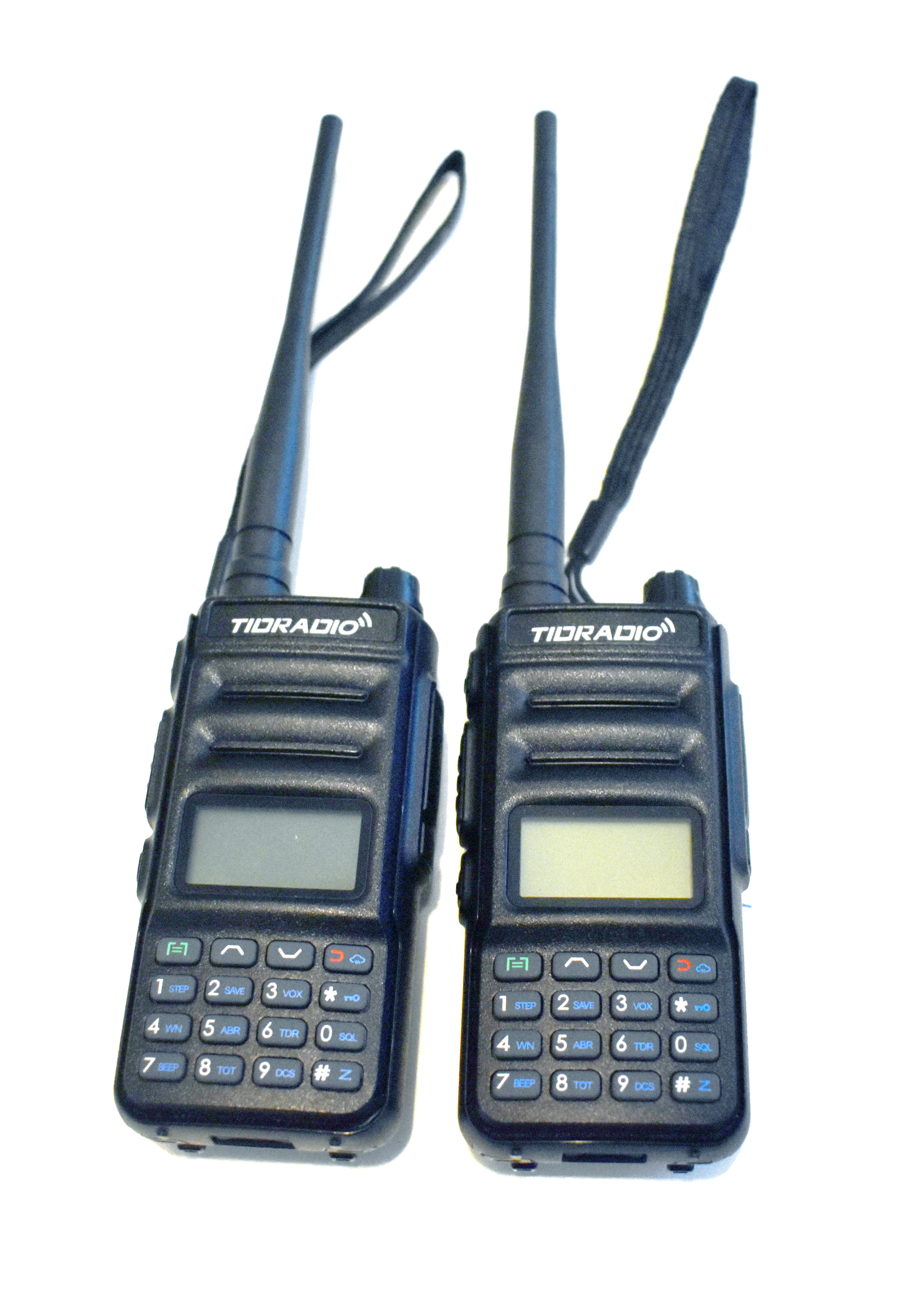
A GMRS radio that also has scanning capabilities

A radio scanner or simply scanner is a radio receiver that can automatically tune discrete frequencies, scanning over a frequency band to find a signal until the initial transmission ceases.

The term scanner generally refers to a communications receiver that is primarily intended for monitoring VHF and UHF landmobile radio systems, as opposed to, for instance, a receiver used to monitor international shortwave transmissions, although these may be classified as scanners too.

More often than not, these scanners can also tune to different types of modulation as well (AM, FM, SSB, etc.). Early scanners were slow, bulky, and expensive. Today, modern microprocessors have enabled scanners to store thousands of channels and monitor hundreds of channels per second. Recent models can follow trunked radio systems and decode digital transmissions such as APCO-P25, Digital mobile radio, NXDN, EDACS, and more. Both hand held and desktop models are available. Scanners are often used to monitor police, fire and emergency medical services. Radio scanning also serves an important role in the fields of journalism and crime investigation, as well as a hobby for many people around the world.

== History and use ==
Scanners developed from earlier tunable and fixed-frequency radios that received one frequency at a time. Non-broadcast radio systems, such as those used by public safety agencies, do not transmit continuously. With a radio fixed on a single frequency, much time could pass between transmissions, while other frequencies might be active. A scanning radio will sequentially monitor multiple programmed channels, or scan between user defined frequency limits and user defined frequency steps. The scanner will stop on an active frequency strong enough to break the radio's squelch setting and resume scanning other frequencies when that activity ceases.

Scanners first became popular and widely available during the popularity height of CB radio in the 1970s. The first scanners often had between four and ten channels and required the purchase of a separate crystal for each frequency received. A US patent was issued to Peter W. Pflasterer on June 1, 1976. An early 1976 US entry was the Tennelec MCP-1, sold at the January 1976 Consumer Electronics Show in Chicago.

== Features ==
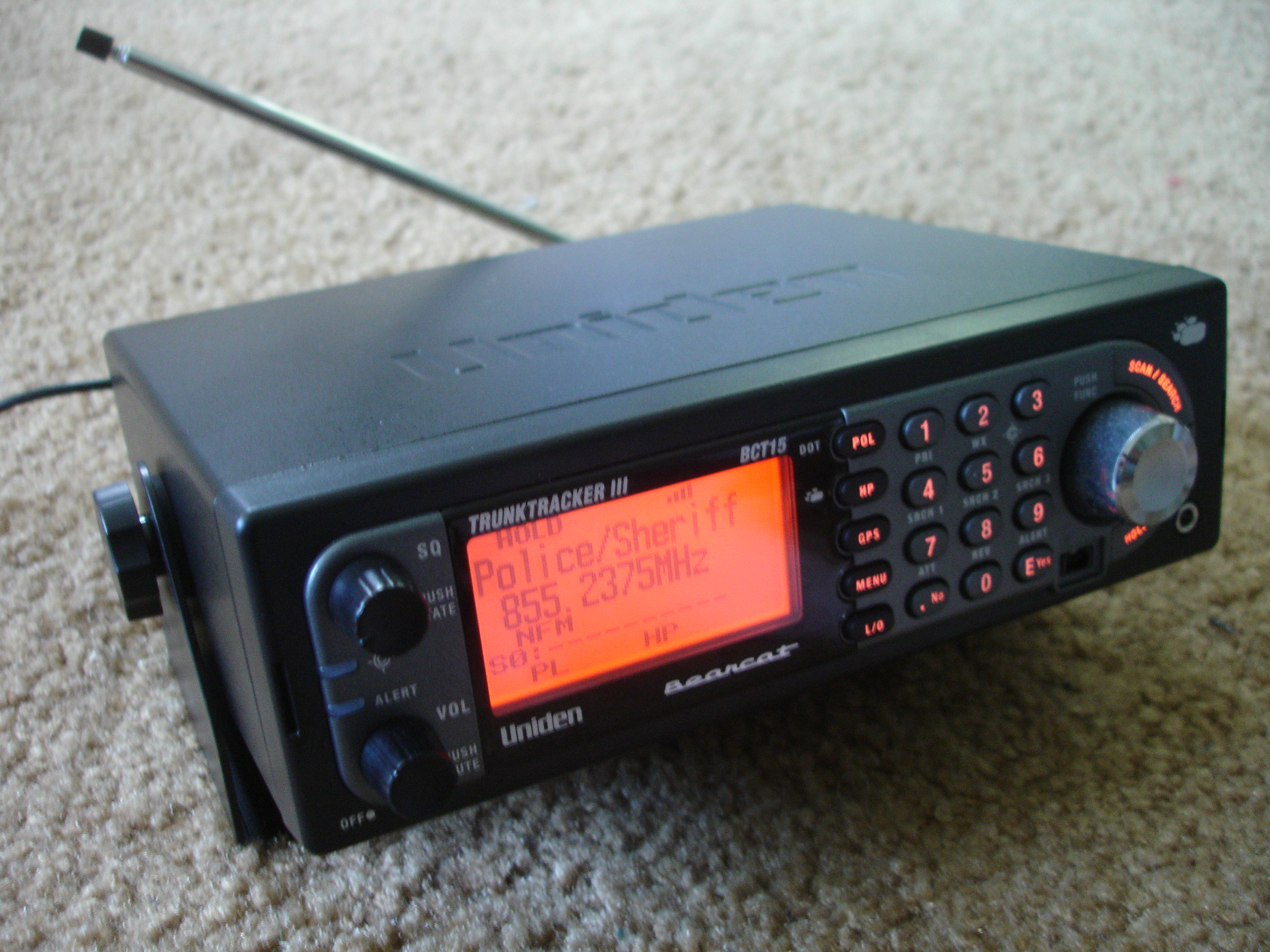
A Uniden BCT-15 base trunktracking scanner

Many recent models will allow scanning of the specific DCS or CTCSS code used on a specific frequency should it have multiple users. Memory banks are also common. For example, one memory bank can be assigned to air traffic control, another can be for local marine communications, and yet another for local police frequencies. These can be switched on and off depending on the user's preference. Most scanners also have a weather radio band, allowing the listener to tune into weather radio broadcasts from a NOAA transmitter. The weather function may also include S.A.M.E. (Specific Area Message Encoding) capability, this allows users to only receive alerts for specific counties that are programmed via the keypad.

Some scanners are equipped with Fire-Tone out. Fire tone out decodes Quick Call type tones and acts as a pager when the correct sequence of tones is detected.

Modern scanners allow hundreds or thousands of frequencies to be entered via a keypad and stored in various "memory banks" and can scan at a rapid rate for activity due to modern microprocessors.

Active frequencies can be found by searching the internet and frequency reference books or can be discovered through a programmable scanner's search function. Antenna modifications may be used. For example, an external antenna can be used for a desktop scanner or an extendable antenna for a hand held unit will provide greater performance than the original equipment "stock" antennas provided by manufacturers.

== Uses ==
Scanners are often used by hobbyists, railfans, aviation enthusiasts, auto race fans, siren enthusiasts, off-duty emergency services personnel, and reporters.

Many scanner clubs exist to allow members to share information about frequencies, codes, and operations. Many have internet presence, such as websites, email lists or web forums.

== Legislation ==
=== Australia ===
It is legal to possess a scanner in Australia and to listen to any transmission that is not classified as telecommunication (i.e. anything not connected to the telephone network). Phone app police scanners are also legal.

=== Austria ===
Possession of a radio scanner is legal. However, article 93 of the Telekommunikationsgesetz prohibits the intentional reception of signals by third parties without authorization from the user.

=== Brazil ===
In Brazil, it is legal to have a scanner, but the user is required to have an amateur radio license. Individuals are prohibited from spreading or recording any information obtained through scanning.

=== Belgium ===
In Belgium it is allowed to possess and listen to a scanner. Although it is only allowed to listen to frequencies where you have a permission to listen to. Without permission it is only allowed to listen to HAM Radio or other so called 'free to listen' channels

=== Canada ===
A situation that occurred in the Toronto area on 28 June 2011 involving York Regional Police officer Constable Garrett Styles was picked up by scanners. Online streaming of communications between the fatally injured officer and police dispatch were picked up by local media. The tragedy was widely reported before the officer's family was notified and several media outlets rebroadcast the recorded emergency transmission. A police initiative pressuring the government to create legislation to stop online streaming of scanner captured police communications was announced in April 2012. Although it is currently legal to stream information from a scanner in Canada, using the information for profit is not legal. Some Canadian police forces use encrypted communications which cannot legally be decrypted and streamed onto the Internet. Applications are available permitting anyone with an Internet-ready computer or smartphone to access scanner communications that are streamed onto the Internet by private individuals who possess the appropriate scanner and computer equipment.

=== Germany ===
German law does not prohibit possession of a scanner. However, the Abhörverbot laid down in article 5 of the Telekommunikation-Medien-Datenschutz-Gesetz (TTDSG) stipulates that it is only legal to listen to or otherwise take knowledge of the contents of four classes of transmissions: those intended for the user of the radio receiver, those made by licensed amateur radio operators, those intended for the general public, and those intended for an indefinite group of people. Violation of this provision is punishable by up to two years in prison or a fine. This prohibition was previously included in the Telekommunikationsgesetz, but was moved to the TTSDG as a part of the German telecom law reform in 2021.

Until 2016, the Telekommunikationsgesetz only prohibited the act of listening to other classes of transmissions. This was broadened as a response to a decision of the Cologne Administrative Court, which in 2008 questioned whether the mere reception and decoding of aircraft transponder signals to display aircraft movements on a screen could be considered listening, as it lacks an acoustic element. This updated wording was carried over to the TTDSG in 2021.

=== Ireland ===
Unlicensed possession of a wireless telegraphy apparatus is generally prohibited under Section 3 of the Wireless Telegraphy Act 1926, subject to exemptions. One such exemption covers most apparatuses only capable of reception, including radio scanners.

Moreover, Section 11(2) of the Act states that "no person shall improperly divulge the purport of any message, communication, or signal sent or proposed to be sent by wireless telegraphy." The aforementioned exemption echoes this wording as a condition of use of covered receive-only apparatuses. No further information regarding the scope of this prohibition is provided.

The Airport Bye-Laws for the Cork Airport and the Dublin Airport specifically ban monitoring air traffic control or airport or airline operational frequencies with radio receiving or recording equipment.

=== Italy ===
Owning a scanner that is able to intercept the frequencies of law enforcement is illegal and carries a jail sentence from eighteen months to five years, as per Article 617 of the Civil Penal Code.

=== Japan ===
In Japan, the Radio Act defines a “radio station” to exclude radio equipment used solely for reception. The Act requires a licence to establish a radio station. Article 59 states that, unless specified by law, no one shall “intercept, divulge or take advantage of” the existence or contents of radio communications conducted for a specified person, subject to the exceptions stated in that article. These provisions do not establish that an amateur-radio licence is required merely to listen with a receive-only scanner. The claims about listening to telephone communications or communications intercepted with tapping devices require separate legal sources and should not be stated as a blanket rule here.

=== Mexico ===
In Mexico, it is legal to have an unblocked scanner and listen to any radio spectrum frequencies, including encrypted and cellular band. According to the Federal Law of General Ways of Communication, individuals are prohibited from spreading any information obtained via a scanner.

=== Netherlands ===
In the Netherlands, it is legal to listen to any radio spectrum frequency because of the "freedom of information"-doctrine. However, if a "special" (i.e., unusual) effort is needed to intercept the information on a frequency (such as decrypting encrypted traffic or using an unauthorized or bootleg radio), then it is considered illegal. In 2008, the Dutch Supreme Court ruled that receivers that can solely be used to detect certain frequencies (such as radar detectors) are illegal because they cannot be used to "convey knowledge or thoughts" and thus are not covered by the aforementioned doctrine.

=== New Zealand ===
In New Zealand, according to section 133A of the Radiocommunications Act of 1989, it is legal to possess and use a scanner at any time to tune to any private voice radio (but not encrypted data), provided that private information is not passed on or disclosed to any other person(s) or party(s).

=== Switzerland ===
Possession of a radio scanner is legal in Switzerland. However, it may only be used to listen to public radio traffic such as CB radio and amateur radio, as well as airband frequencies.

=== United Kingdom ===
In the United Kingdom, it is not illegal to own or use a scanner except in particular circumstances. For example, particular transmissions or frequencies should only be listened to with authorization an example of this being UK aviation frequencies and police radio, which in many other countries may be publicly listened to (and are even available to be streamed online) but in the UK are restricted. Many emergency services have now switched to digital encrypted radio systems, so that it is more difficult for the general public to listen to them.

=== United States ===
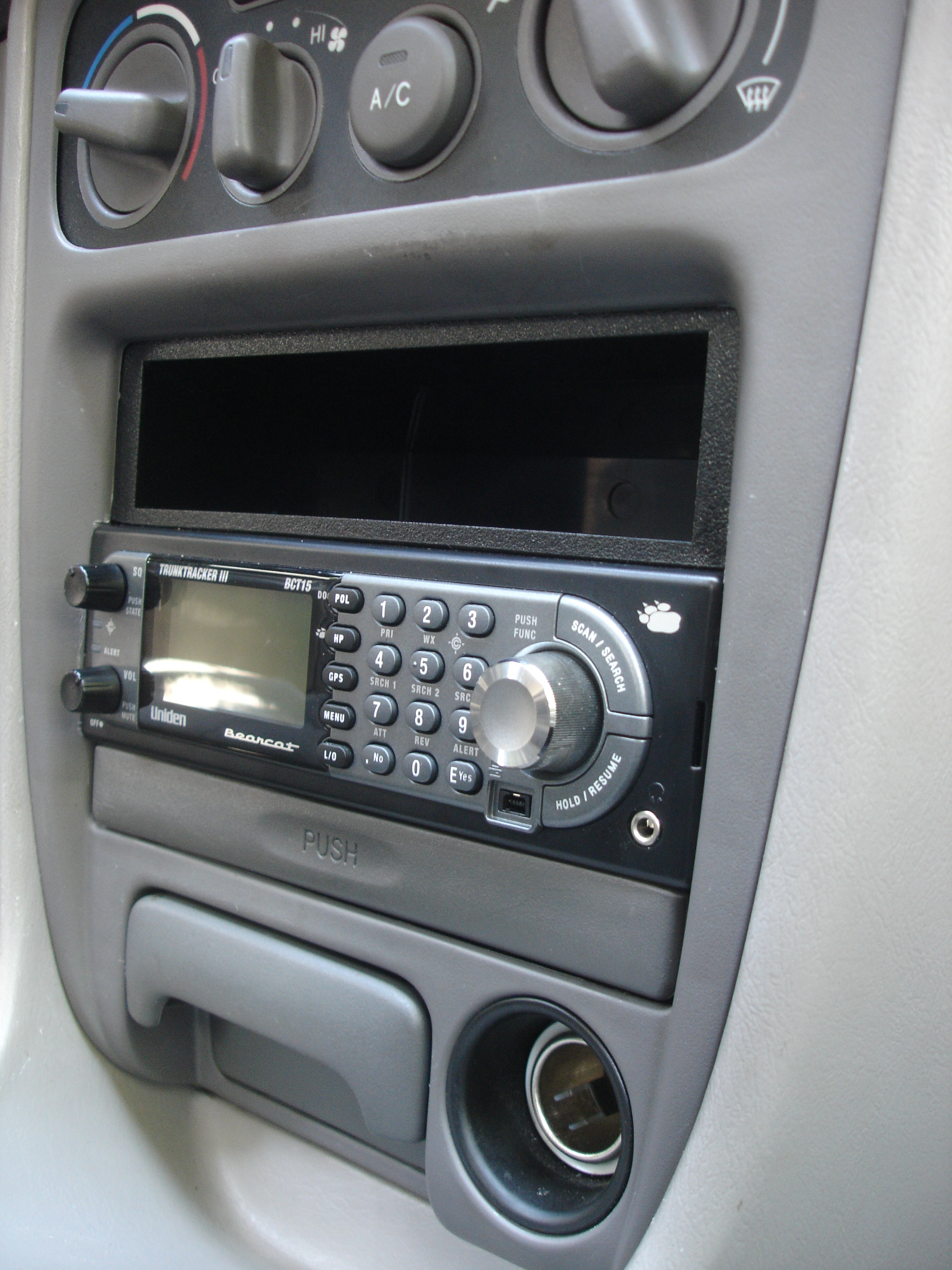
A Uniden scanner installed in a vehicle. Some US states prohibit this unless the operator has an FCC issued radio license

The legality of radio scanners in the United States varies considerably between jurisdictions, although it is a federal crime to monitor encrypted cellular phone calls. Five U.S. states restrict the use of a scanner in an automobile. Scanners capable of following trunked radio systems and demodulating some digital radio systems such as APCO Project 25 are available.

A law passed by the Congress of the United States, under the pressure from cellular telephone interests, prohibited scanners sold after a certain date from receiving frequencies allocated to the Cellular Radio Service. The law was later amended to make it illegal to modify radios to receive those frequencies, and also to sell radios that could be easily modified to do so. This law remains in effect even though no cellular subscribers still use analog technology. There are Canadian and European unblocked versions available, but these are illegal to import into the U.S. Frequencies used by early cordless phones at 43.720–44.480 MHz, 46.610–46.930 MHz, and 902.000–906.000 MHz can still be picked up by many commercially available scanners, however. The proliferation of scanners led most cordless phone manufacturers to produce cordless handsets operating on a more secure 2.4 GHz system using spread-spectrum technology. Certain states in the United States such as New York and Florida, prohibit the use of scanners in a vehicle unless the operator has a radio license issued from the Federal Communications Commission (FCC) (Amateur Radio, etc.) or the operator's job requires the use of a scanner in a vehicle (e.g., police, fire, utilities). Many scanner user manuals include a warning saying that, while it is legal to listen to almost every transmission a scanner can receive, but there are some that persons should not intentionally listen to (such as telephone conversations, pager transmissions, or any scrambled or encrypted transmissions) under the Electronic Communications Privacy Act, and that modifications to do so are illegal.

In some parts of the United States, there are extra penalties for the possession of a scanner during a crime, and some states, such as Michigan, also prohibit the possession of a scanner by a person who has been convicted of a felony in the last five years.

It is illegal to use police scanners while driving in Florida, Indiana, Kentucky, New York, and Minnesota.

It is also illegal to use police scanners in furtherance of a crime in California, New Jersey, Michigan, Oklahoma, Rhode Island, South Dakota, Vermont, Virginia, Nebraska and West Virginia.

Many people including siren enthusiasts, aviation enthusiasts, and more use scanner audio or footage and post them online or live-stream them. Older people who are involved in these group (mainly siren enthusiasts) have said that putting siren activation tones in videos is either illegal or dangerous. Their reasoning is that in 2017 a very large siren system in Dallas, Texas had been hacked and all of the sirens in Dallas County went off in the middle of the night. According to some siren enthusiasts the hack was done by using a two-way radio and using a video online using activation tones from Dallas County's dispatch center. The hacker then transmitted the video with tones in it over the dispatch frequency which led to all of the sirens going off in Dallas. More of these hacks happened in places such as Cincinnati, Ohio, Milwaukee, Wisconsin and other cities. After this many siren enthusiasts stopped putting activation tones in videos so that they would not be used maliciously. A lot of arguments in the siren community have spun up after these hacks. Some enthusiasts began altering or pitch shifting tones so that they do not sound like the real activation tones and some still keep them in there, however they put a disclaimer in the description of the video saying they will not be held responsible for misuse of activation tones. The reason why activation tones are in videos in the first place is to alert the enthusiasts of when said siren is about to go off. With this being in mind, this is what some sources say about putting scanner audio in videos (including tones). Section 705 of the Communications Act States that: No person not being authorized by the sender shall intercept any radio communication and divulge or publish the existence, contents, substance, purport, effect, or meaning of such intercepted communication to any person. 47 U.S.C. § 605(a). The penalties for violating this section are severe: a fine of not more than $2000, imprisonment, or both or, where such violation is “willful" and for purposes of direct or indirect commercial advantage or private financial gain,” a fine of up to $50,000 and imprisonment of not more than two years for the first such conviction and up to $100,000 and five years for subsequent convictions. In addition, the statute provides for a private civil remedy to any person aggrieved by a violation of this section. The FCC regulations implementing this section more specifically provide those messages originated by “privately owned non-broadcast stations . . . may be broadcast only upon receipt of prior permission from the non-broadcast licensee.” When people read this, they took it as putting scanner broadcasts online is illegal. This is not true because it only refers to the interception of broadcasts. This means it is still legal to put scanner audio in videos, but you cannot re-broadcast them over said frequency. Since most police, fire, EMS, and public safety frequencies are public and publicly available in the FCC Database, you can still put audio in videos no matter what the audio is.

In the United States, licensed amateur radio operators with a valid FCC license may possess amateur radio transceivers capable of reception beyond the amateur radio bands per an FCC Memorandum & Order known as FCC Docket PR91-36 (also known as FCC 93-410).

Uniden and Whisler are the main companies making police scanners.

== See also ==
- Dispatcher
- Police radio
- Clandestine radio
- Communications receiver
- Uniden, manufacturer of Radio scanners
