= APCO-16 =

Trunked radio standard

In telecommunications, APCO-16, (sometimes APCO Project 16 or Project 16) is a US standard for the characteristics and capabilities of public safety trunked radio systems.

The standard development effort was started in the 1970s by the APCO, a trade association of mostly police and fire service providers. The program was funded by the Law Enforcement Assistance Administration (LEAA), a part of the US Department of Justice.

== Details ==
APCO-16 describes such characteristics and capabilities as:

- channel access times
- automated priority recognition
- data systems interface
- individuality of system users
- command and control flexibility
- system growth capability
- frequency use
- reliability

With the Federal Communications Commission's pending release of the first 800 MHz (Note: The report said 900 MHz but this is believed to be a typographical error. The Department of General Services report should read, 800 MHz instead of 900 MHz.) band licenses, the LEAA funded a project to develop required capabilities and standards needed in trunked public safety two-way radio systems. The report defined proposed methods for frequency reuse, coordination, and interference reduction. The standards also gained acceptance in businesses such as Specialized Mobile Radio, utility communications systems, and refineries.

The study concluded that those frequencies would be suitable for Public Safety mobile radio uses. The study recognized that certain technical problems like "picket fencing", foliage interference and abrupt signal fall out posed some minor problems, also addressed concerns about health effects from 800 MHz transmitters but did not reveal definitive findings. The availability of the significant additional spectrum and the long term possibility of the eventual collocation of nearly all Public Safety communications into one segment of the spectrum far outweighed these problems.

While the program succeeded in creating basic performance standards and feature sets, it failed to create a signaling standard. The result: three companies built APCO Project 16 compliant systems but radios from each manufacturer were incompatible with one another. In California, for example, University of California, Riverside bought a Motorola system and the County of Riverside purchased a General Electric. In order to communicate, some patch or other custom-built link would have to be installed. Intercommunication was possible but not seamless.

A by product of the work on Project 16 was the recognition that the problems of interagency cooperation inherent in the then standard allocations of separate frequencies to separate functions and agencies in the Public Safety Service might be solved by the use of digital addressing, trunking techniques.

=== Project 16A ===
A follow-on project titled APCO Project 16A was funded by a second LEAA grant. It addressed a proposal to open the 800 MHz band. This program defined technical details such as "channel access time", "system growth capability", and "reliability". Project 16A identified the organizational advantages that would accrue from assigning individual unit addresses and adding another "group" address element.

The group element would permit routine unit communications privacy among members of a group while permitting the intercommunications between groups as controlled by a central "group assignment" controller. The extent of the scope of such intra unit coordination would be limited only by the design of the management structure involved and limitations of the addressing and control mechanism technology.

=== Project 16B ===
A third LEAA grant funded Project 16B, "Draft System Implementation Plans for Participating Communities", which addressed how such a system might be implemented in four US cities. This project was funded as a study by the LEAA but actual hardware funding was never authorized.

== See also ==
- National Institute of Justice
- APCO Project 25
