= Motorola Type I =

Motorola Type I Is the original type of Motorola's Trunked radio system; it is based on Fleets and Subfleets. Each system had a certain number of Fleets assigned, and then each Fleet had a certain number of Subfleets and radio IDs. The distribution of Fleets and Subfleets on a Type I system is determined by the system Fleetmap. Motorola Type I systems are not scalable because they limit the amount of IDs any fleet or subfleet can support. Each Type I ID appears as a three or four digit number, followed by a hyphen, followed by a one or two digit number (example 200-14).

The term "Privacy Plus" refers to a Type I system. Privacy Plus systems are normally older public safety systems and SMRs.
