= OpenSky =

Wireless communications system

OpenSky is a registered trademark of Harris Corporation and is the trade name for a wireless communication system, invented by M/A-COM Inc., that is now a division of Harris RF Communications. OpenSky technology applies voice over IP transport to radio communications applications in a unique architecture.

In the mid-1990s FedEx invited proposals for a data and voice network to the vehicular level. As the world's largest shipper, FedEx was a key opportunity, and major market players presented their existing product offerings over some time.

M/A-COM presented their concept, and won the business. They delivered a standards-based infrastructure that attempted to leverage open systems to the largest degree possible, while adapting specific input/output to meet the customer's exact requirements.

OpenSky received the direct attention of Tyco Electronics when they acquired it along with AMP Inc. Tyco Electronics funded the company to acquire the EDACS radio system team and product line. The OpenSky system has since been sold into a number of important footprints, including the entire State of Pennsylvania, and the State of New York.

On January 15, 2009, the State of New York terminated its contract with M/A-COM due to ongoing and unresolved deficiencies with the OpenSky system. On February 13, 2009, Tyco Electronics filed a complaint against the New York State Office for Technology (NY-OFT), in the New York State Court of Claims, disputing the claims made by the OFT. In the complaint, Tyco Electronics disputed many of the NY-OFT's public criticisms of both the company and the system, maintaining that SWN (which included OpenSky) ‘worked as contracted.’ The complaint also claimed the state hindered the company's ability to build the system in a timely manner, defamed the company by stating that its technology did not work, and that the state inappropriately drew $50 million from the standby letter of credit the company established for the project.

On May 29, 2009, Harris Corporation purchased Tyco Electronics Wireless Systems, including its OpenSky and other wireless communication technologies, from Tyco Electronics for US$675 million.

As of the end of 2014, it was announced that, due to ongoing problems faced by the State Police and other users, the Pennsylvania Statewide Radio Network will be replaced by a Project 25 Phase II system. It will be VHF/UHF/800 multi-band and is expected to be fully operational by the end of 2021.
