= Control channel =

Central channel that controls other constituent radios

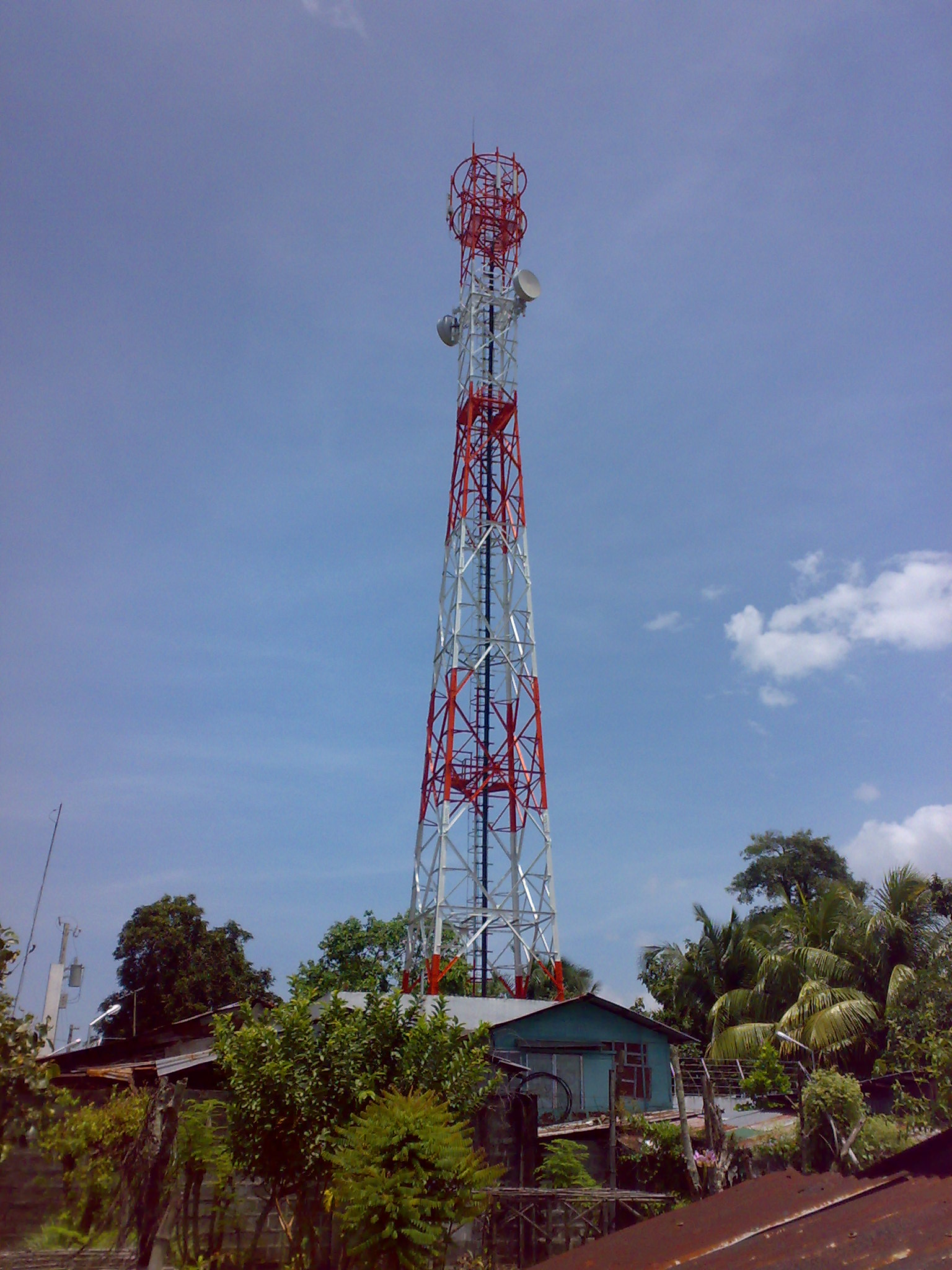
A Cellular network tower in the Philippines.

In radio communication, a control channel is a central channel that controls other constituent radios by handling data streams. It is most often used in the context of a trunked radio system, where the control channel sends various data which coordinates users in talkgroups.

In GSM networks, Control Channels are divided into three categories: Broadcast Channel (BCH), Common Control Channel (CCCH), and Dedicated Control Channel (DCCH).

== Broadcast Channel (BCH) ==
The group of Broadcast Channel is subdivided into three channels:

1. Broadcast Control Channel (BCCH)
2. Frequency Correction Channel (FCCH)
3. Synchronization Channel (SCH)

The BCCH is transmitted by the base transceiver station (BTS) at all times. The radio frequency (RF) carrier used to transmit the BCCH is referred to as the BCCH carrier. The mobile station (MS) monitors the information carried on the BCCH periodically (at least every 30 secs), when it is switched on and not in a call.

The BCCH Consists of:

a. Broadcast Control Channel (BCCH): Carries the following information:

- Location Area Identity (LAI).
- List of neighboring cells that should be monitored by the MS.
- List of frequencies used in the cell.
- Cell identity.
- Power control indicator.
- DTX permitted.
- Access control (i.e., emergency calls, call barring ... etc.).
- CBCH description.

The BCCH is transmitted at constant power at all times, and all MS that may seek to use it to measure its signal strength. “Dummy” bursts are transmitted to ensure continuity when there is no BCCH carrier traffic.

b. Frequency Correction Channel (FCCH): This is transmitted frequently on the BCCH timeslot and allows the mobile to synchronize its own frequency to that of the transmitting base site. The FCCH may only be sent during timeslot 0 on the BCCH carrier frequency and therefore it acts as a flag to the mobile to identify Timeslot 0. It has a sequence of 148 zeros transmitted by the BTS.

c. Synchronization Channel (SCH) The SCH carries the information to enable the MS to synchronize to the TDMA frame structure and know the timing of the individual timeslots. The following parameters are sent:

- Frame number.
- Base Site Identity Code (BSIC).

The MS will monitor BCCH information from surrounding cells and store the information from the best six cells. The SCH information on these cells is also stored so that the MS may quickly resynchronize when it enters a new cell. Follows the FCCH and contains BTS identification and location information.

== Common Control Channels ==
The Common Control Channel (CCCH) is responsible for transferring control information between all mobiles and the BTS. This is necessary for the implementation of “call origination” and “call paging” functions. It consists of the following:

a. Random Access Channel (RACH) Used by the mobile when it requires gaining access to the system. This occurs when the mobile initiates a call or responds to a page.

b. Paging Channel (PCH) Used by the BTS to page MS, (paging can be performed by an IMSI, TMSI or IMEI).

c. Access Grant Control Channel (AGCH) Used by the BTS to assign a dedicated control channel to a MS in response to an access message received on the Random Access Channel. The MS will move to the dedicated channel in order to proceed with either a call setup, response to a paging message, Location Area Update or Short Message Service.

d. Cell Broadcast Channel (CBCH) This channel is used to transmit messages to be broadcast to all MS’s within a cell. The CBCH uses a dedicated control channel to send its messages, however it is considered a common channel because all mobiles in the cell can receive the messages.

Active MS’s must frequently monitor both BCCH and CCCH. The CCCH will be transmitted on the RF carrier with the BCCH.

== Dedicated Control Channels ==
The DCCH is a single timeslot on an RF carrier that is used to convey eight Stand-alone Dedicated Control Channels (SDCCH). A single MS for call setup, authentication, location updating and SMS point to point use a SDCCH. As we will see later, SDCCH can also be found on a BCCH/CCCH timeslot, this configuration only allows four SDCCHs.

a. Slow Associated Control Channel (SACCH) Conveys power control and timing information in the downlink direction (towards the MS) and Receive Signal Strength Indicator (RSSI), and link quality reports in the uplink direction.

b. Fast Associated Control Channel (FACCH) The FACCH is transmitted instead of a TCH. The FACCH ‘‘steals” the TCH burst and inserts its own information. The FACCH is used to carry out user authentication, handovers, and immediate assignment.

c. Stand-alone Dedicated channel (SDCCH)

All of the control channels are required for system operation, however, in the same way that we allow different users to share the radio channel by using different timeslots to carry the conversation data, the control channels share time slots on the radio channel at different times. This allows efficient passing of control information without wasting capacity that could be used for call traffic. To do this we must organize the times lots between those, which will be used for traffic, and those, which will carry control signaling. DCCH is control channel.

== Channel Combination ==
The different logical channel types mentioned are grouped into what are called channel combination. The four most common channel combination are listed below:

1. Full Rate Traffic Channel Combination – TCH8/FACCH + SACCH

2. Broadcast Channel Combination – BCCH + CCCH

3. Dedicated Channel Combination – SDCCH8 + SACCH8

4. Combined Channel Combination – BCCH+CCCH+SDCCH4+SACCH4

5. Half Rate Traffic Channel Combination – TCH16/FACCH +

The Half Rate Channel Combination (when introduced) will be very similar to the Full Rate Traffic Combination.

== See also ==
- Trunked radio system
