= EDACS =

Radio communications protocol

The Enhanced Digital Access Communication System (EDACS) is a radio communications protocol and product family invented by the General Electric Corporation in the mid 1980s. The rights were eventually bought by Harris Corporation, which eventually stopped manufacturing these devices in 2012, and ended all service in 2017.

== History ==
A young designer, Jeff Childress, created an autonomous radio base-station controller, known as the GETC (General Electric Trunking Card). The GETC was a general-purpose controller with input/output optimized for radio system applications.

Childress and the team demonstrated that a smart controller could be adapted to a variety of applications, but his interest was really in fault tolerance.

The EDACS system architecture supported large communications footprints. By making the GETC's "trunk" among themselves, one GETC per channel, the system was designed to be inherently fault-tolerant. This provided substantial hardware reductions, and the required software efforts yielded a variety of unique features and options.

This was not a new concept in systems design; however, few other teams have embodied it cleanly into such wide distribution.

== Software ==
Software for system managers and radio monitors alike has been developed outside of the vendor. ETrunker is a modification to the Trunker code to work on the EDACS control channel. Users of the software can monitor and log complete system activity. See the Trunker Site for more info.

== Digital Voice Modes ==
The first digital voice mode developed for EDACS was GE's Voice Guard, utilizing sub-band coding for its datastream at a rate of 9600 bps. Voice quality was not great, however, with it quickly being replaced by AEGIS.

AEGIS was the second generation EDACS digital voice mode, made once again by GE, with Adaptive Multiband Encoding as its coding scheme. The voice quality was supposedly 10 times better than Voice Guard, but it was still not very great, especially compared to ProVoice.

ProVoice is Tyco Electronics' (formerly M/A-COM, Ericsson and GE) implementation of IMBE digital modulation for radio communications, being the third generation of EDACS digital voice. It is not APCO-25 compliant, but does use the same IMBE vocoder developed by Digital Voice Systems, Inc. (DVSI). The technical difference between ProVoice and the APCO Project-25 standard is how error correction and modulation is provided to transmit the data.
