= Jar (disambiguation) =

A jar is a type of rigid, cylindrical container.

Jar(s), JAR, or The Jar(s) may also refer to:

== Arts and entertainment ==
=== Film ===
- The Jar, a 1984 American horror film directed by Bruce Toscano
- The Jar: A Tale From the East, a 2001 Syrian animated film
- JAR Pictures, an Indian motion picture production company

=== Literature ===
- "The Jar", a 1944 story by Ray Bradbury

=== Music ===
- The Jars, an American new wave band 1978–1982
- Flybanger, originally Jar, a Canadian metal band
- JaR, the duo Jay Graydon and Randy Goodrum
- Jar (album), by Superheaven, 2013
- "J.A.R.", a song by Green Day, 1995
- "Jars" (song), by Chevelle, 2009
- "Jars", a song by Downthesun from Downthesun, 2002
- "Jars", a song by the Black Dahlia Murder from Nightbringers, 2017

== Military and government ==
- Jar (unit), an obsolete Royal Navy unit of capacitance
- Joint Aviation Requirements, issued by Europe's Joint Aviation Authorities
- Order of the Jar, a medieval Spanish military order

== People ==
- Alexandru Jar (1911–1988), Romanian poet and novelist
- Gabriel Jars (1732–1769), French mining and metallurgical specialist

== Places ==
=== Places ===
- Car, Azerbaijan, a village in Zaqatala District, Azerbaijan
- Jar, Iran, in Isfahan Province
- Jar, Kurdistan, Iran
- Jar, Norway, in Bærum
  - Jar station, an Oslo Metro and the Oslo Tramway station
  - Jar IL, a sports club
- Jars, Cher, France
- Jewish Autonomous Oblast, or Jewish Autonomous Region, Russia
- Plain of Jars, Laos

=== Structures ===
- JAR Stadium, in Tashkent, Uzbekistan
- James A. Rhodes Arena, on the campus of the University of Akron, Ohio, US
- John A. Ryan Arena, a hockey rink in Watertown, Massachusetts, US

== Science and technology ==
- Jamming avoidance response, of weakly electric fish
- JAR (file format), Java ARchive file
- Drilling jar, part of a well drill string

== Other uses ==
- Jarawa language (Nigeria) (ISO 639-3 code)
- Jar, a Procter & Gamble brand

== See also ==
- Ajar (disambiguation)
- Jaar (disambiguation)
- Jarra (disambiguation)
- Jarre, a surname
- Jareš, a surname
