= Ajar =

Ajar or AJAR may refer to:

== Places ==
- Ajar, Afghanistan
- Ajar, Mauritania

== People ==
- Ajar people, an ethnographic group of Georgians
- Johnny Ajar
- Émile Ajar

== Publications ==
- Australian Journal of Agricultural Research
- African Journal of AIDS Research, a peer-reviewed medical journal

== Other uses ==
- AJAR (applications software platform), a Motorola software platform for mobile phones
- Ajar dialect

== See also ==
- Acar (disambiguation)
- Jar (disambiguation)
