= Seoul Metropolitan Police Agency =

Municipal police agency in South Korea

Coordinates: 37°34′29″N 126°58′20″E

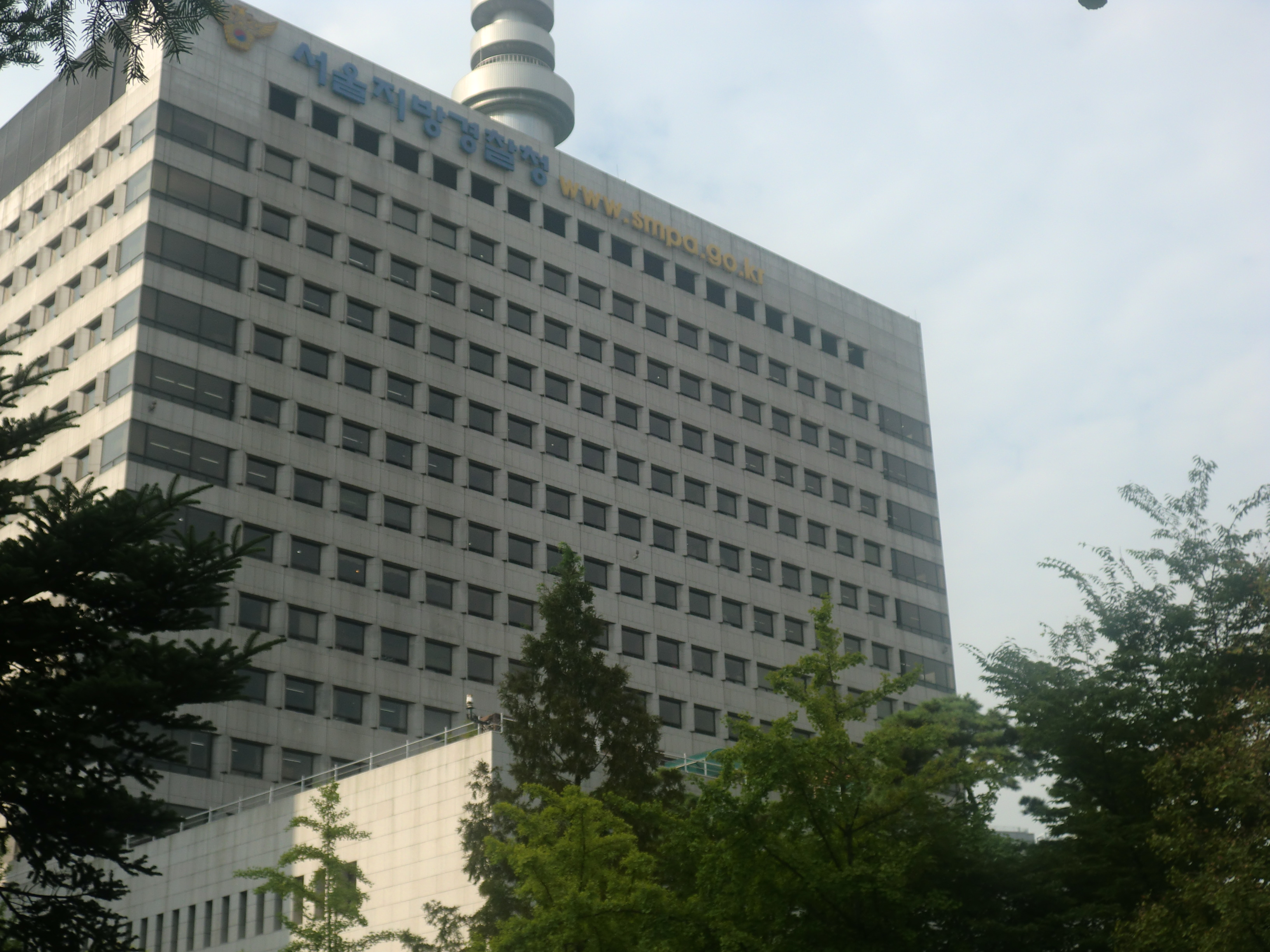
Seoul Metropolitan Police Agency Building

Emblem of SMPA

The Seoul Metropolitan Police Agency (SMPA; Korean: 서울특별시경찰청; Hanja: 서울特別市警察廳; RR: Seoulteugbyeolsigyeongchalcheong) is the primary police force for the South Korean capital city of Seoul. The agency is not an independent police force, but is one of eighteen provincial sub-divisions of the National Police Agency. The SMPA is headquartered along with the National Police Headquarters in Seoul. While modern police agencies of Seoul can trace their history back to 1945 with the creation of a Korean police force, the modern-day Metropolitan Police Agency in Seoul came into being on August 1, 1991 and currently polices over 10 million inhabitants.

== History ==
The Gyeonggi-do Police Department was the predecessor police force in Seoul. It was established on August 15, 1945. This was quickly followed up by the creation of a National Police Force on October 21, and a more dedicated Seoul Metropolitan Police Force on September 17, 1946. This organization underwent a series of reforms, including a renaming to the Metropolitan Police Bureau in 1948, the creation of the National Assembly Police Security Guards in 1951, the Seoul Mobile Police Corps' creation in 1961, the Central Government Complex Police Security Guards in 1971, which were quickly joined by the Airport Police Security Guards in 1973 and the Olympic Security Guards in 1985. Together, these divisions became the present day Seoul Metropolitan Police Agency in 1991, with "1 Deputy Commissioner General, 7 departments, 2 directors, 17 divisions [and] 7 direct control squads."

=== Events since 1993 ===
In 1993, the SMPA was tasked with the investigation of a possible bomb threat to visiting American President Bill Clinton, as what was later termed a gas-pipe explosion took place in the Grand Hyatt Seoul Hotel, where he was planning to stay. In 1999, SMPA riot officers with tear gas and water cannons faced "several hundred" pro-unification marchers at Seoul National University, however despite rocks being thrown at the police, there was no response and no serious clashes were reported.

The SMPA was given custody of two US Army soldiers charged with negligently killing two teenage girls in 2002. In 2006 the SMPA arrested a North Korean defector and ex bodyguard of Kim Jong-il, as well as three others for trading fake aphrodisiacs in Seoul.

In 2007 SMPA was under scrutiny following the resignation of its police chief, Hong Young-ki, after an alleged revenge attack. Allegations were made that the SMPA overlooked the attack by its police chief on one of South Korea's richest men.

In the aftermath of the Seoul Halloween crowd crush on 29 October 2022, it was reported on 20 January 2024 that the chief, Kim Kwang-ho, was charged with negligence. Kim is accused of failing to ensure there were enough officers deployed on the ground on the incident night.

== Uniforms, organization, and ranks ==
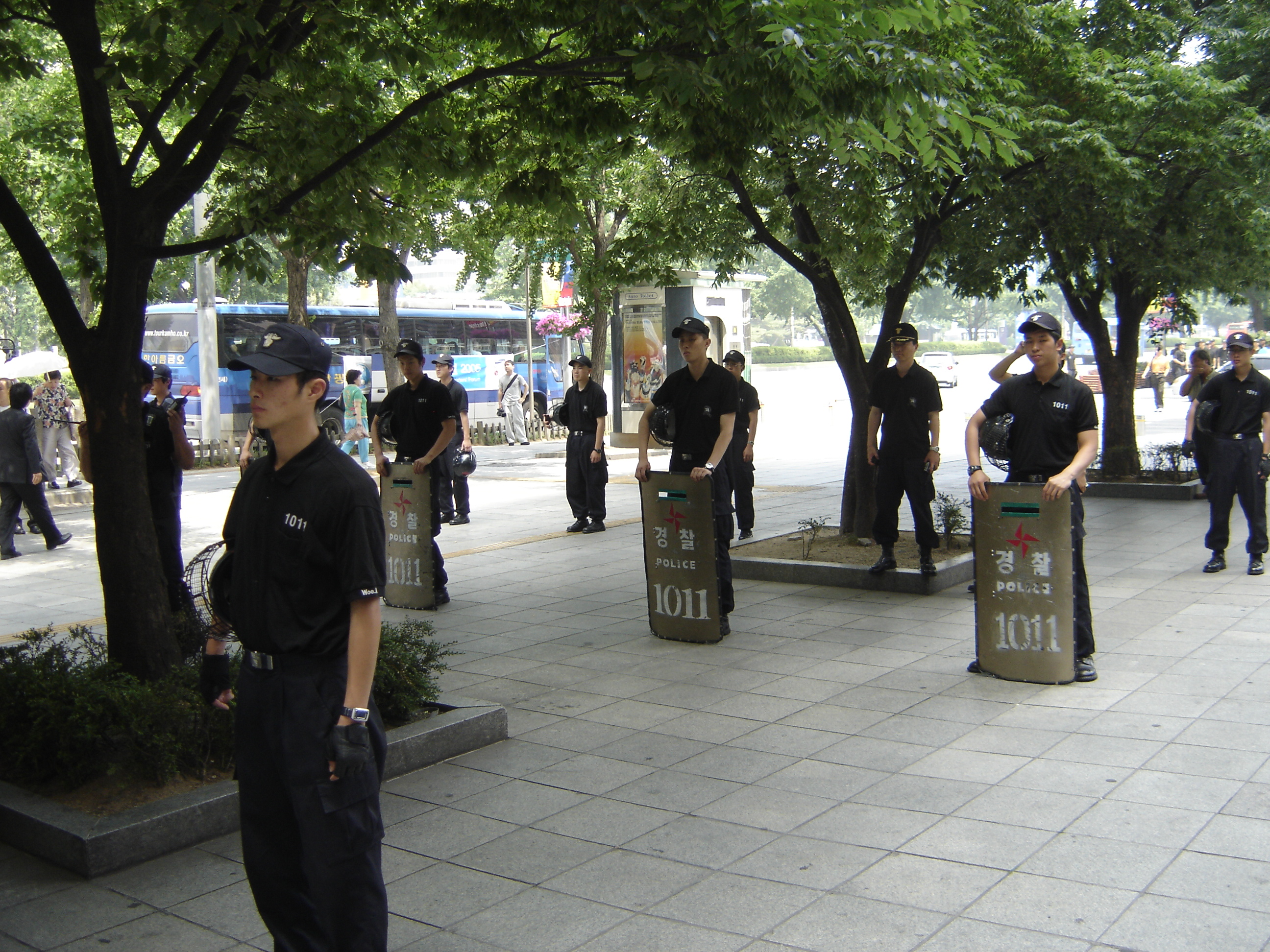
Riot Police of the SMPA stand ready with riot shields.

| Rank in Korean | Rank in English | Abbreviation | Code |
|---|---|---|---|
| 치안정감(治安正監) | Chief Superintendent General | Ch. Supt. Gen | CSG |
| 치안감(治安監) | Senior Superintendent General | Sen. Supt. Gen | SCG |
| 경무관(警務官) | Superintendent General | Supt. Gen. | SG |
| 총경(總警) | Senior Superintendent | Sen. Supt. | SS |
| 경정(警正) | Superintendent | Supt. | S |
| 경감(警監) | Senior Inspector | Sen. Ins. | SI |
| 경위(警衛) | Inspector | Ins. | I |
| 경사(警查} | Assistant Inspector | Ass. Ins. | AI |
| 경장(警長) | Senior Policeman | Sen. Pol. | SP |
| 순경(巡警) | Policeman | Pol. | P |
| 의무경찰(義務警察) | Auxiliary Police | Aux. | AP |

=== Uniforms ===
The working uniforms of the SMPA consist of dark green or black trousers, light green or blue shirt and a black or white officer's cap with emblems corresponding to the above ranks. The dress uniform, which has remained the same since 1945, consists of full black dress uniform and cap for male officers, and similar blue dress uniforms for female officers. The golden barnstar emblem of the SMPA which originated with its creation in 1945 was gradually phased out in favor of a smaller golden star by 1991, with similar golden, and then silver stars.

=== Organization ===
The SMPA is organized under a commissioner, who works with the chiefs of a public relations division and an inspections relations division, as well as a deputy commissioner, to oversee the police force. The force is split into two sections, one which contains all the police officer corps, the Korean SWAT units, security guards and air units, and the other which contains intelligence, public affairs, security and traffic departments which in turn manage specialist police divisions of their own.

== Equipment ==
The SMPA operates much equipment which is standardized throughout the entire Korean National Police force. The metropolitan areas in particular user Automatic Vehicle Number Identification systems, however SMPA's computer dispatch systems, Automatic Vehicle Location Systems and Mobile Data Terminals are standard features across the country, as is policy of using specialist armed police rather than issuing firearms to each officer. SMPA also operates a significant percentage of the National Police Force's 4,891 police cars, 1,685 police pick- ups, 765 police trucks, 865 special-mission vehicles and 9,181 police motorcycles.

The SMPA does, however, utilise certain technologies that are unique to its own force. With such a large population, the SMPA contracted Sepura to outfit 5,000 TETRA radios and communication equipment to officers in July 2007. Sepura SRH3800 sGPS hand-held radios, and SRM3500 and SRG3500 in-vehicle radios were provided, along with new technology making its debut with the SMPA. The SMPA also utilise Road Speed Determination systems to collect real-time traffic information for Seoul's road network via GPS to be available for SMPA road units and members of the public.

== Criticism ==
- SMPA Traffic Information Center requested that TV journalists report a university student led candlelight rally as an "illegal rally" on June 12, 2011.
