= Jarr =

Jarr may also refer to:

- Jarr., former name of Canadian metal band Flybanger
- Shahîd ibn Jarr, the name for Seth in Yazidism
- DJ JARR, the stage name of Yaroslav Yeremenko, a Ukrainian DJ, music producer, and remixer from Kramatorsk

== See also ==
- Jar (disambiguation)
