= Storno =

European company

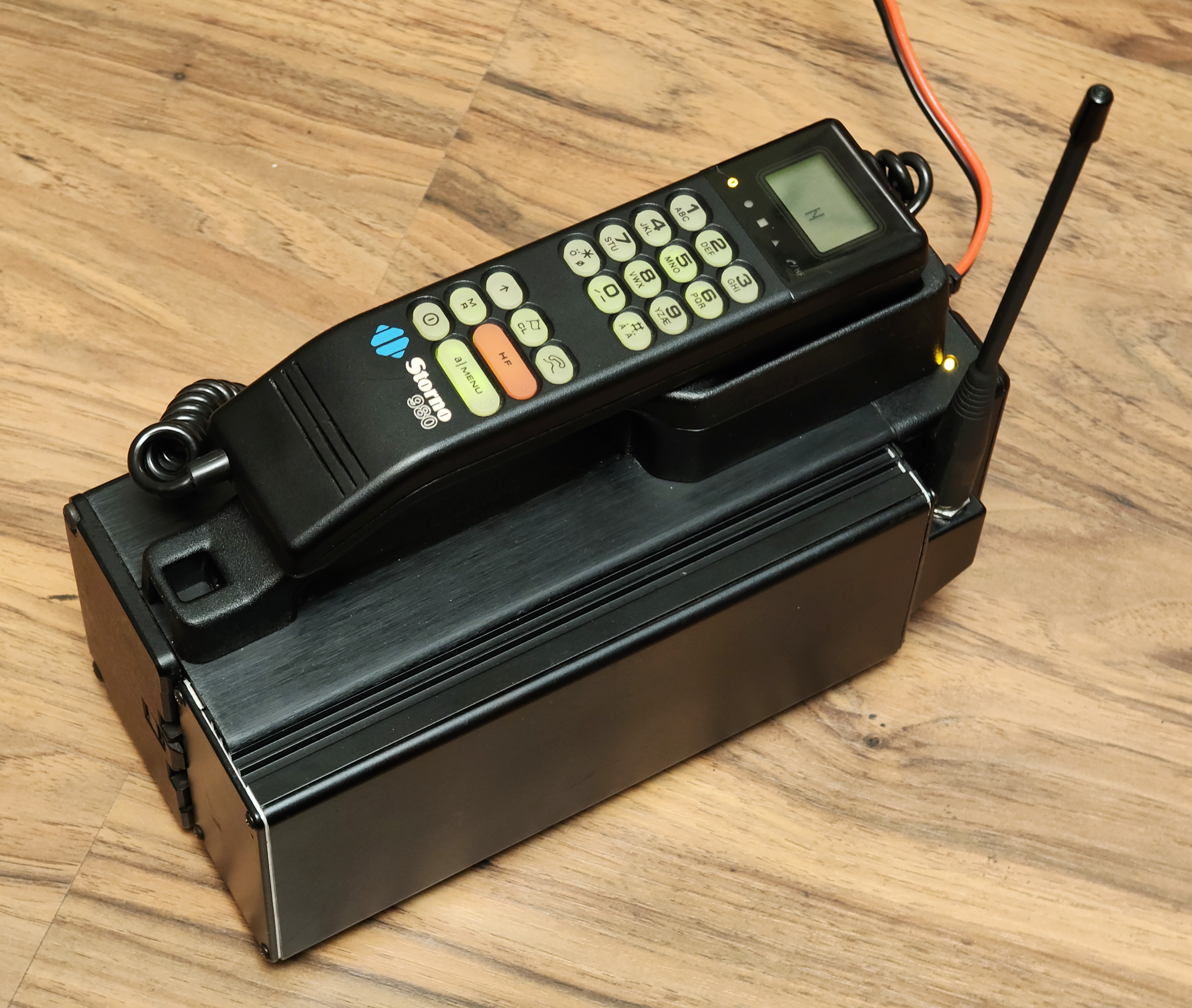
Storno 980 mobile phone, 1988, manufactured by Motorola Storno.

Storno was one of the early leaders in the field of Public and Private Mobile Radio (PMR) in Europe. The company is probably best known for its Radiotelephones and Mobile telephones like the Stornophone and Stornomatic series.

During the 1970s it became very successful and by 1975 one in four of all radio telephones in Europe was made by Storno. The number of export markets had exceeded 80 countries.

The 1986 acquisition by Motorola resulted in a whole new range of innovative communication products for the new owner, who continued using the Storno brand for another 6 years. Storno was still headquartered in Denmark, and continued manufacturing in Germany and United Kingdom. With the addition of Storno's two-way radio products and the success of Motorola's MC microTM line, the sector significantly strengthened its position in Europe.

== History ==
The Storno company was formed in July 1947 as a division of The Great Nordic Telegraph Company in Denmark. The name Storno was formed from the name of the parent company (Stor + no).

Storno entered the Swedish market in 1950, and in 1968 the company was transformed into an independent stock company, which was still fully owned by The Great Nordic Telegraph Company.

In 1960 Storno Ltd. was established

In the 1950s and 1960s Storno was the third largest producer worldwide, next to two U.S. companies; Motorola and General Electric. Storno produced what is today known as ‘closed’ radio communications systems for police forces, airports, transport companies, etc. Storno and Ericsson were heavily involved in developing the path breaking Nordic Mobile Telephony (NMT) system launched in 1981 as the world's first cross international public (or ‘open’) mobile communications system, a predecessor of the successful GSM System, which was implemented in 1992. In the late 1980s the Nordic companies and authorities, with Nokia and Ericsson acting as the leading architects to a substantial degree, influenced the GSM standardisation process. The largest producer of mobile terminals at the time, Motorola, acquired Storno in 1986 to avoid being excluded from this important process.

The ICT sector of Northern Denmark became a stronghold in Europe of Ericsson and Storno alongside Motorola and General Electric in the U.S. In the 1950s and 1960s Storno was the third largest producer world-wide, next to the two U.S. companies.

In January 1973, a newspaper wrote that motorists will be able to turn to any telephone subscriber in Finland and the rest of the world. The radio calls to and from the car are established without the involvement of clerks and, unlike the existing car phone services, cannot be intercepted by unauthorized persons.

In an effort to tap the specialized knowledge in the cluster, Motorola purchased Storno in 1986.

In 1975 the American electronics giant General Electric bought half of the shares in Storno, and in 1978 GE took over a further 25%. The remaining 25% was acquired in 1981.

In 1978 Storno had become one of the UK's leading suppliers of acquisition radiocommunication equipment.

In 1981 Storno was among the first to implement the NMT, an automatic cellular phone system.

In 1979, Storno employed over 2,400 employees.

In 1982 the portable car phone Stornomatic 900 made it possible to go everywhere and still be available, despite a weight of 11.5 kilos.

In 1986, General Electric sold Storno to Motorola, who let the name continue for the time being. The acquisition resulted in a whole new range of innovative communication products for the new owner. Storno was still headquartered in Denmark, and continued manufacturing in Flensburg, Germany and Camberley, United Kingdom. With the addition of Storno's two-way radio products and the success of Motorola's MC microTM line, the sector significantly strengthened its position in Europe.

In 1989 the company changed its name to Motorola Storno Danmark, and the Storno name was still used on the products until January 1992.
