= TETRA =

European standard for trunked radio systems

Terrestrial Trunked Radio
- Type: Incentive
- Industry: European Telecommunications Standards Institute professional mobile radio trunked radio system
- Founded: 1995; Europe
- Headquarters: Europe

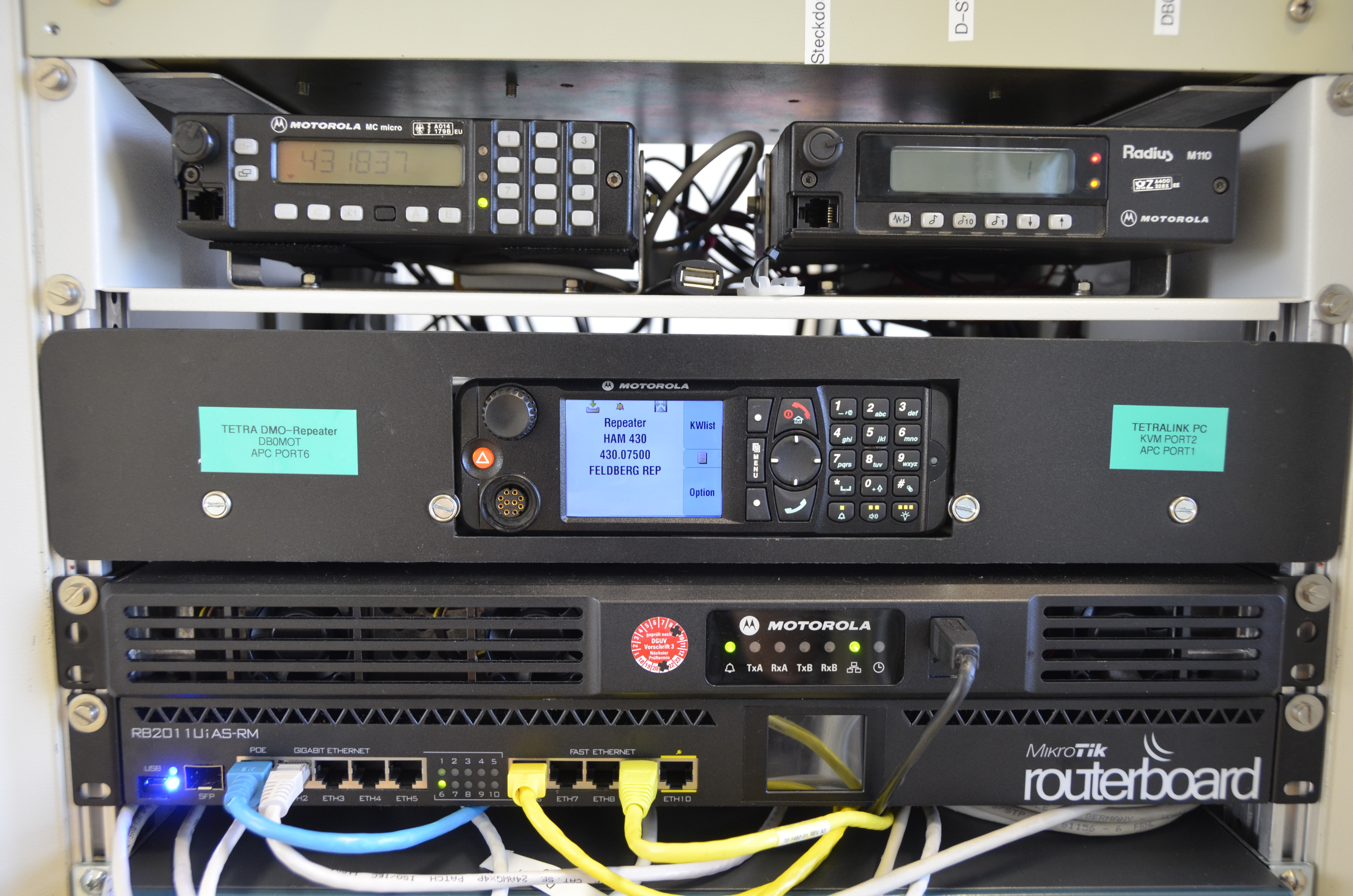
TETRA DMO Amateur radio repeater

Terrestrial Trunked Radio (TETRA; formerly known as Trans-European Trunked Radio), a European standard for a trunked radio system, is a professional mobile radio and two-way transceiver specification. TETRA was specifically designed for use by government agencies, emergency services, (police forces, fire departments, ambulance) for public safety networks, rail transport staff for train radios, transport services and the military. TETRA is the European version of trunked radio, similar to Project 25.

TETRA is a European Telecommunications Standards Institute (ETSI) standard, first version published 1995; it is mentioned by the European Radiocommunications Committee (ERC).

== Description ==
TETRA uses time-division multiple access (TDMA) with four user channels on one radio carrier and 25 kHz spacing between carriers. Both point-to-point and point-to-multipoint transfer can be used. Digital data transmission is also included in the standard though at a low data rate.

TETRA Mobile Stations (MS) can communicate direct-mode operation (DMO) or using trunked-mode operation (TMO) using switching and management infrastructure (SwMI) made of TETRA base stations (TBS). As well as allowing direct communications in situations where network coverage is not available, DMO also includes the possibility of using a sequence of one or more TETRA terminals as relays. This functionality is called DMO gateway (from DMO to TMO) or DMO repeater (from DMO to DMO). In emergency situations this feature allows direct communications underground or in areas of bad coverage.

In addition to voice and dispatch services, the TETRA system supports several types of data communication. Status messages and short data services (SDS) are provided over the system's main control channel, while packet-switched data or circuit-switched data communication uses specifically assigned channels.

TETRA provides for authentication of terminals towards infrastructure and vice versa. For protection against eavesdropping, air interface encryption and end-to-end encryption is available.

The common mode of operation is in a group calling mode in which a single button push will connect the user to the users in a selected call group and/or a dispatcher. It is also possible for the terminal to act as a one-to-one walkie talkie but without the normal range limitation since the call still uses the network. TETRA terminals can act as mobile phones (cell phones), with a full-duplex direct connection to other TETRA Users or the PSTN. Emergency buttons, provided on the terminals, enable the users to transmit emergency signals, to the dispatcher, overriding any other activity taking place at the same time.

== Advantages ==
The main advantages of TETRA over other technologies (such as GSM) are:

- The much lower frequency used gives longer range, which in turn permits very high levels of geographic coverage with a smaller number of transmitters, thus cutting infrastructure costs.
- During a voice call, the communications are not interrupted when moving to another network site. This is a unique feature, which dPMR networks typically provide, that allows a number of fall-back modes such as the ability for a base station to process local calls. So called 'mission critical' networks can be built with TETRA where all aspects are fail-safe/multiple-redundant.
- In the absence of a network, mobiles/portables can use 'direct mode' whereby they share channels directly (walkie-talkie mode).
- Gateway mode - where a single mobile with connection to the network can act as a relay for other nearby mobiles that are out of range of the infrastructure. A dedicated transponder system isn't required in order to achieve this functionality, unlike with analogue radio systems.
- TETRA also provides a point-to-point function that traditional analogue emergency services radio systems did not provide. This enables users to have a one-to-one trunked 'radio' link between sets without the need for the direct involvement of a control room operator/dispatcher.
- Unlike cellular technologies, which connect one subscriber to one other subscriber (one-to-one), TETRA is built to do one-to-one, one-to-many and many-to-many. These operational modes are directly relevant to the public safety and professional users.
- Security TETRA supports terminal registration, authentication, air-interface encryption and end-to-end encryption.
- Rapid deployment (transportable) network solutions are available for disaster relief and temporary capacity provision.
- Network solutions are available in both reliable circuit-switched (telephone like) architectures and flat, IP architectures with soft (software) switches.

Further information is available from the TETRA Association (formerly TETRA MoU) and the standards can be downloaded for free from ETSI.

== Disadvantages ==
Its main disadvantages are:

- Security issues have been identified, although mitigations were quickly introduced in the TETRA security standard. There was an intentional weakening of the TEA1 cipher to meet export control criteria, allowing a break within a minute on consumer hardware. (See Description)
- Requires a linear amplifier to meet the stringent RF specifications that allow it to exist alongside other radio services.
- Data transfer is slow by modern standards.

Up to 7.2 kbit/s per timeslot, in the case of point-to-point connections, and 3.5 kbit/s per timeslot in case of IP encapsulation. Both options permit the use of between one and four timeslots. Different implementations include one of the previous connectivity capabilities, both, or none, and one timeslot or more. These rates are ostensibly faster than the competing technologies DMR, dPMR, and P25 are capable of. Latest version of standard supports 115.2 kbit/s in 25 kHz or up to 691.2 kbit/s in an expanded 150 kHz channel. To overcome the limitations many software vendors have begun to consider hybrid solutions where TETRA is used for critical signalling while large data synchronization and transfer of images and video is done over 3G / LTE / 5G.

== Technical details ==
=== Radio aspects ===
For its modulation TETRA, uses π/4 differential quadrature phase-shift keying. The symbol (baud) rate is 18,000 symbols per second, and each symbol maps to 2 bits, thus resulting in 36,000 bit/s gross.

As a form of phase shift keying is used to transmit data during each burst, it would seem reasonable to expect the transmit power to be constant. However it is not. This is because the sidebands, which are essentially a repetition of the data in the main carrier's modulation, are filtered off with a sharp filter so that unnecessary spectrum is not used up. This results in an amplitude modulation and is why TETRA requires linear amplifiers. The resulting ratio of peak to mean (RMS) power is 3.65 dB. If non-linear (or not-linear enough) amplifiers are used, the sidebands re-appear and cause interference on adjacent channels. Commonly used techniques for achieving the necessary linearity include Cartesian loops, and adaptive predistortion.

The base stations normally transmit continuously and (simultaneously) receive continuously from various mobiles on different carrier frequencies; hence the TETRA system is a frequency-division duplex (FDD) system. TETRA also uses FDMA/TDMA (see above) like GSM. The mobiles normally only transmit on 1 slot/4 and receive on 1 slot/4 (instead of 1 slot/8 for GSM).

Speech signals in TETRA are sampled at 8 kHz and then compressed with a vocoder using algebraic code-excited linear prediction (ACELP). This creates a data stream of 4.567 kbit/s. This data stream is error-protection encoded before transmission to allow correct decoding even in noisy (erroneous) channels. The data rate after coding is 7.2 kbit/s. The capacity of a single traffic slot when used 17/18 frames.

A single slot consists of 255 usable symbols, the remaining time is used up with synchronisation sequences and turning on/off, etc. A single frame consists of 4 slots, and a multiframe (whose duration is 1.02 seconds) consists of 18 frames. Hyperframes also exist, but are mostly used for providing synchronisation to encryption algorithms.

The downlink (i.e., the output of the base station) is normally a continuous transmission consisting of either specific communications with mobile(s), synchronisation or other general broadcasts. All slots are usually filled with a burst even if idle (continuous mode). Although the system uses 18 frames per second only 17 of these are used for traffic channels, with the 18th frame reserved for signalling, Short Data Service messages (like SMS in GSM) or synchronisation. The frame structure in TETRA (17.65 frames per second), consists of 18,000 symbols/s; 255 symbols/slot; 4 slots/frame, and is the cause of the perceived "amplitude modulation" at 17 Hz and is especially apparent in mobiles/portables which only transmit on one slot/4. They use the remaining three slots to switch frequency to receive a burst from the base station two slots later and then return to their transmit frequency (TDMA).

=== Radio frequencies ===
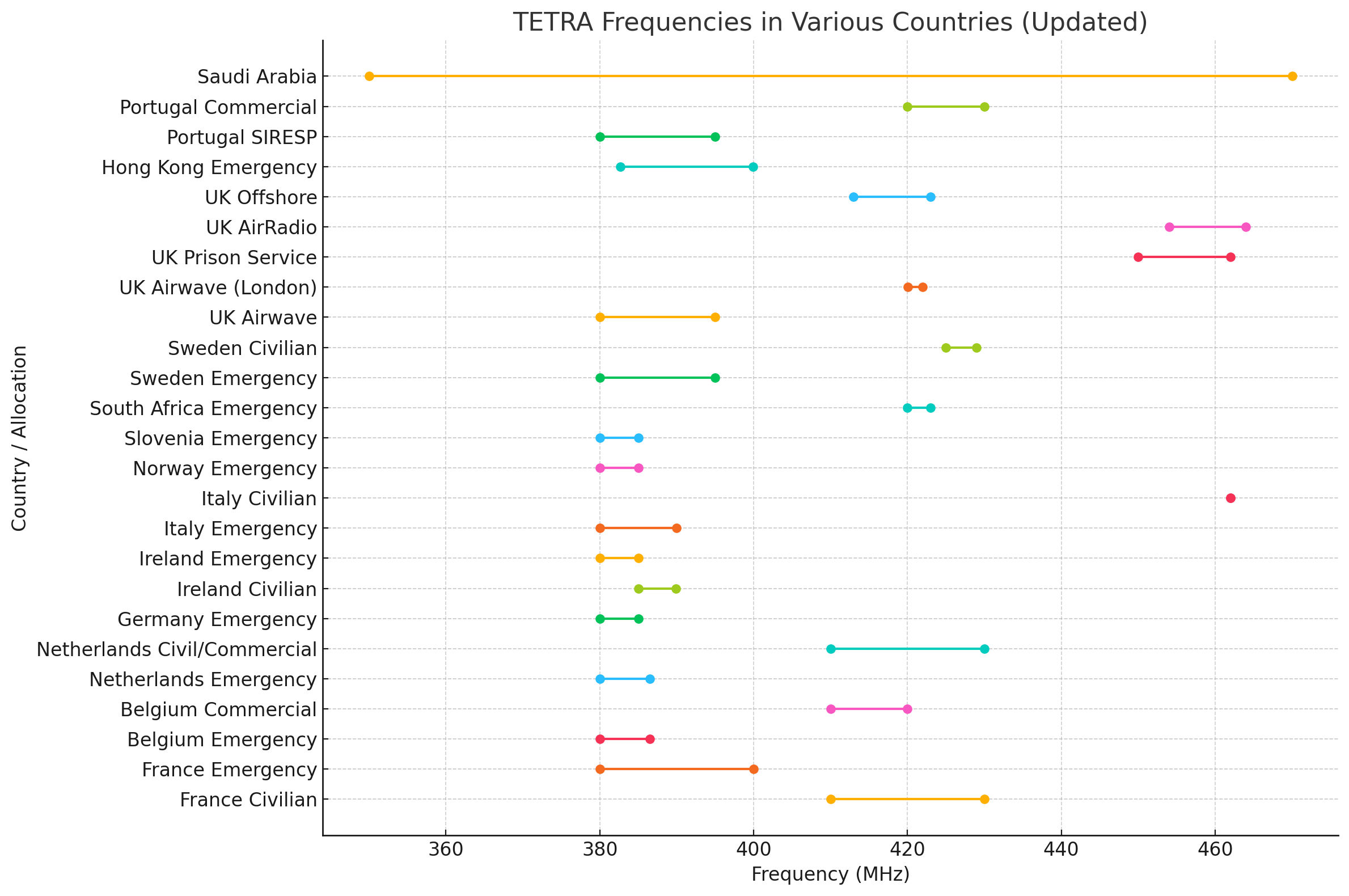
Chart to visualize the bands used for TETRA in Europe

TETRA frequencies in South America
Number	Frequency pair (MHz)	
Number	Band 1	Band 2
Emergency systems
1	380–383	390–393
2	383–385	393–395
Civil systems
1	410–420	420–430
2	870–876	915–921
3	450–460	460–470
4	385–390	395–399.9

TETRA frequencies in other countries
Country	Allocation	Frequency pairs (MHz)
France	Civilian/private	410–430
France	Emergency services	380–400
Belgium	Emergency services/civilian	380–386.5, 390–396.5
Belgium	Commercial	410-420
the Netherlands	Emergency services	380–386.5, 390–396.5
the Netherlands	Civil/Commercial	410–430
Germany	Emergency services	380–385, 390–395, 406 - 410 for DMO
Iceland	Emergency services/civilian	380–385, 390–395
Ireland	Civilian/private	385–389.9, 395–399.9
Ireland	Emergency services	380–385, 390–395
Italy	Emergency services / armed forces	380–390
Italy	Civilian/private	462
Norway	Emergency services	380–385, 390–395, 406.1–426, 870–876
Slovenia	Emergency services	380-385 (MS), 390-395 (BS)
South Africa	Emergency services, Public works	420–423
Sweden	Emergency services	380-395
Sweden	Civilian/airport/public transportation	425-429
UK	Airwave	390.0125–394.9875, 380.0125–384.9875
UK	Airwave (London only)	420.0125-421.9875, 410.0125–412.9875
UK	Prison service	450, 460 / 452, 462
UK	AirRadio	454, 464 or 460
UK	Offshore Oil platforms	423, 413
Hong Kong	Emergency services	382.65–399.9, 410–430
Hong Kong	Civil/Private	806–818, 851–863
Portugal	SIRESP - Public Safety	380–395
Portugal	Commercial/Private	420–430
Saudi Arabia		350–370, 380–395, 385–399.99, 410–430, 450–470, 870–921

=== Air interface encryption ===
To provide confidentiality the TETRA air interface is encrypted using one of the TETRA Encryption Algorithm (TEA) ciphers. The encryption provides confidentiality (protect against eavesdropping) as well as protection of signalling.

Currently 7 different ciphers are standardized: TEA1 to TEA4 in TEA Set A and TEA5 to TEA7 in TEA Set B. These TEA ciphers should not be confused with the block cipher Tiny Encryption Algorithm. The TEA ciphers have different availability due to export control and use restrictions. In the past few details were published concerning these proprietary ciphers. Riess mentions in early TETRA design documents that encryption should be done with a stream cipher, due to the property of not propagating transmission errors. Parkinson later confirms this and explains that TEA is a stream cipher with 80-bit keys. The algorithms were later reversed and it appeared that TEA1 reduces its key strength to 32 bits to allow exportability under the Wassenaar arrangement. TEA1 and TEA4 provide basic level security, and are meant for commercial use. The TEA2 cipher is restricted to European public safety organisations. The TEA3 cipher is for situations where TEA2 is suitable but not available.

==== Security vulnerabilities of the air interface encryption ====
An in-depth review published in July 2023 by the company Midnight Blue B.V. of the TETRA standard and encryption algorithms, claims multiple security flaws, referred by the company as "TETRA:BURST". A total of 5 flaws were filed to the CVE database:

- The Air Interface Encryption (AIE) keystream generator is vulnerable to decryption oracle attacks due to the use of publicly-broadcast network time—keystream reuse can be triggered for acknowledged unicast communication when using static keys (security class 2). This is not applicable for group communication. Mitigations for this were introduced into version 4 of the TETRA standard.
- TEA1 contains a reduction step that effectively downgrades the cryptographic strength from 80 to 32 bits implemented to allow export under the Wassenaar convention, allowing anyone to break the cipher and subsequently decrypt the signal in as little as one minute using a modern-day consumer laptop. "There's no other way in which this can function than that this is an intentional backdoor," "This constitutes a full break of the cipher, allowing for interception or manipulation of radio traffic", according to the news report posted on ComputerWeekly. The reduction in strength of TEA1 seems to be known in intelligence circles and is referred to in the famous 2006 Wikileaks dump of US diplomatic communications.
- AIE contains no authentication for the ciphertext, making malleability attacks possible.
- The cryptographic anonymization scheme is weak and can be partially reversed to track users. A revised identity encryption scheme was introduced in version 4 of the TETRA standard in mitigation.
- The authentication algorithm theoretically allowed attackers to set the derived cipher key to 0 but not to decrypt traffic. Although this attack remains theoretical, mitigations were introduced in version 4 of the TETRA security standard.

In addition, the Midnight Blue B.V. team spots a "peculiarity regarding the TEA3 S-box", but further analysis has not been shown to lead to any weakness.

ETSI published TR 104 291 that addresses the additional measures put in place in the TETRA security standards for every perceived TETRA vulnerability. This allows TETRA operators and users to check with their TETRA system manufacturers and to perform a risk assessment to decide on the necessity or urgency of countermeasures.

The vulnerabilities related to algorithms remained publicly unknown for 28 years after TETRA's publication because TETRA did not initially make definitions of its cryptographic algorithms public, an example of security through obscurity, although details have now been made public. The Midnight Blue B.V. team gained access to TETRA's cryptographic code by attacking the trusted execution environment on a TETRA-enabled radio. The team points to a list of previously broken cryptographic systems relying on obscurity and argues that the Kerckhoffs's principle should have been followed: the system would have been safer when its structure is publicly known, despite common practice for encryption systems for government use to remain confidential.

=== Cell selection ===
==== Cell re-selection (or hand-over) in images ====
RSSI SRT FRT cell limit (propagation delay exceed)

This first representation demonstrates where the slow reselect threshold (SRT), the fast reselect threshold (FRT), and propagation delay exceed parameters are most likely to be. These are represented in association with the decaying radio carrier as the distance increases from the TETRA base station.

From this illustration, these SRT and FRT triggering points are associated to the decaying radio signal strength of the respective cell carriers. The thresholds are situated so that the cell reselection procedures occur on time and assure communication continuity for on-going communication calls.

==== Initial cell selection ====
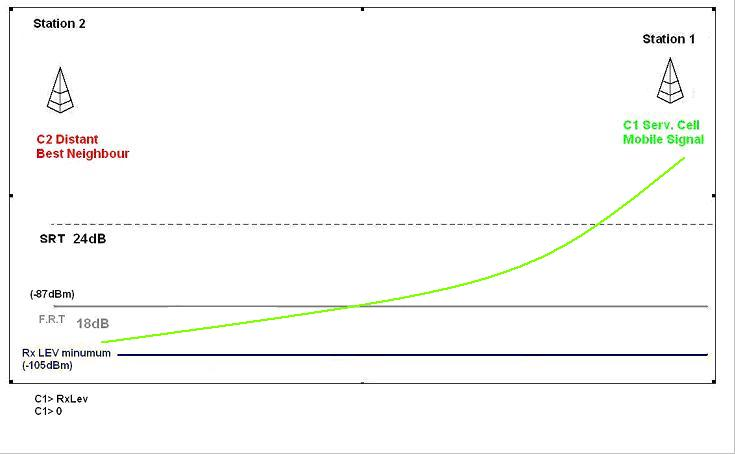
Cell initial selection

The next diagram illustrates where a given TETRA radio cell initial selection. The initial cell selection is performed by procedures located in the MLE and in the MAC. When the cell selection is made, and possible registration is performed, the mobile station (MS) is said to be attached to the cell. The mobile is allowed to initially select any suitable cell that has a positive C1 value; i.e., the received signal level is greater than the minimum receive level for access parameter.

The initial cell selection procedure shall ensure that the MS selects a cell in which it can reliably decode downlink data (i.e., on a main control channel/MCCH), and which has a high probability of uplink communication. The minimum conditions that shall have to be met are that C1 > 0. Access to the network shall be conditional on the successful selection of a cell.

At mobile switch on, the mobile makes its initial cell selection of one of the base stations, which indicates the initial exchanges at activation.

- Refer to EN 300 392 2 16.3.1 Activation and control of underlying MLE service
- Note 18.5.12 Minimum RX access level

The minimum receive access level information element shall indicate the minimum received signal level required at the SwMI in a cell, either the serving cell or a neighbour cell as defined in table 18.24.

==== Cell improvable ====
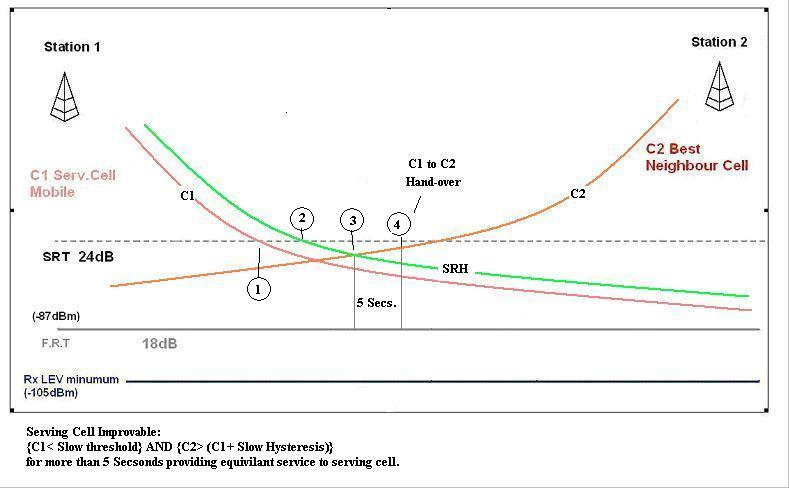
Cell improvable

The next diagram illustrates where a given TETRA radio cell becomes improvable. The serving cell becomes improvable when the following occurs: the C1 of the serving cell is below the value defined in the radio network parameter cell reselection parameters, slow reselect threshold for a period of 5 seconds, and the C1 or C2 of a neighbour cell exceeds the C1 of the serving cell by the value defined in the radio network parameter cell reselection parameters, slow reselect hysteresis for a period of 5 seconds.

==== Cell usable ====
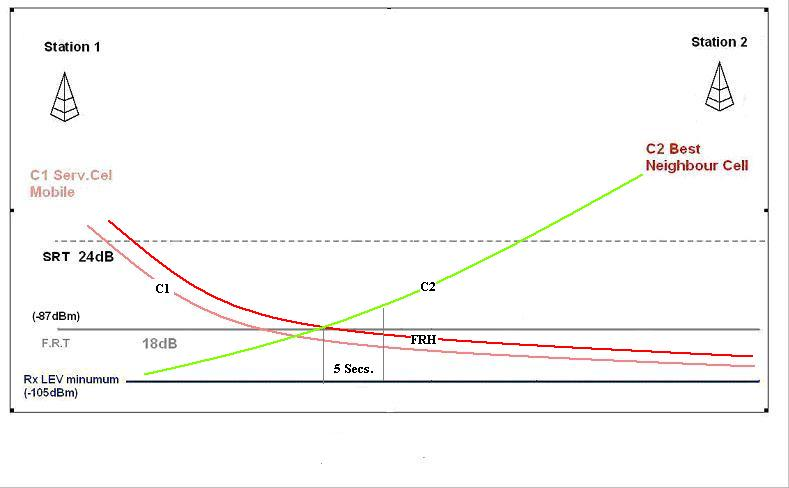
Cell usable

The next diagram illustrates where a given TETRA radio cell becomes usable. A neighbour cell becomes radio usable when the cell has a downlink radio connection of sufficient quality.

The following conditions must be met in order to declare a neighbour cell radio usable: The neighbour cell has a path loss parameter C1 or C2 that is, for a period of 5 seconds, greater than the fast reselect threshold plus the fast reselect threshold, and the service level provided by the neighbour cell is higher than that of the serving cell. No successful cell reselection shall have taken place within the previous 15 seconds unless MM requests a cell reselection. The MS-MLE shall check the criterion for serving cell relinquishment as often as one neighbour cell is scanned or monitored.

The following conditions will cause the MS to rate the neighbour cell to have higher service level than the current serving cell:

- The MS subscriber class is supported on the neighbour cell but not on the serving cell.
- The neighbour cell is a priority cell and the serving cell is not.
- The neighbour cell supports a service (that is, TETRA standard speech, packet data, or encryption) that is not supported by the serving cell and the MS requires that service to be available.
- The cell service level indicates that the neighbour cell is less loaded than the serving cell.

==== Cell relinquishable (abandonable) ====
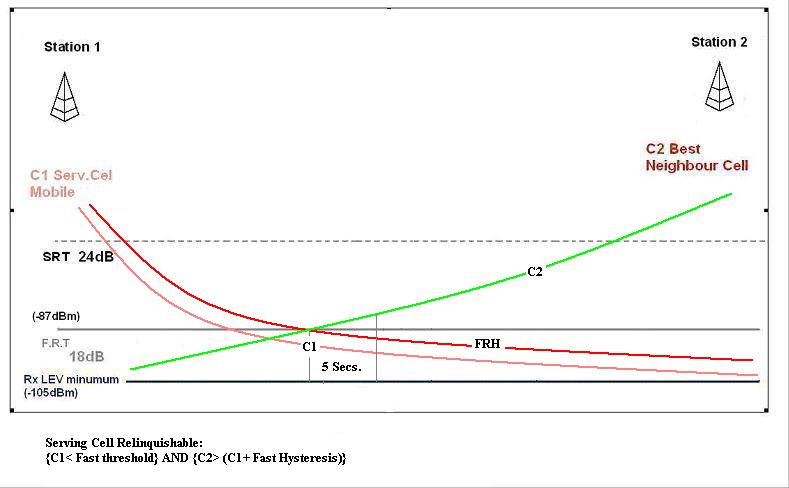
Cell relinquishable

The next diagram illustrates where a given TETRA radio cell becomes relinquishable (abandonable). The serving cell becomes relinquishable when the following occurs: the C1 of the serving cell is below the value defined in the radio network parameter cell reselection parameters, fast reselect threshold, for a period of 5 seconds, and the C1 or C2 of a neighbour cell exceeds the C1 of the serving cell by the value defined in the radio network parameter cell reselection parameters, fast reselect hysteresis, for a period of 5 seconds.

No successful cell reselection shall have taken place within the previous 15 seconds unless Mobility Management (MM) requests a cell reselection. The MS-MLE shall check the criterion for serving cell relinquishment as often as one neighbour cell is scanned or monitored.

==== Radio down-link failure ====
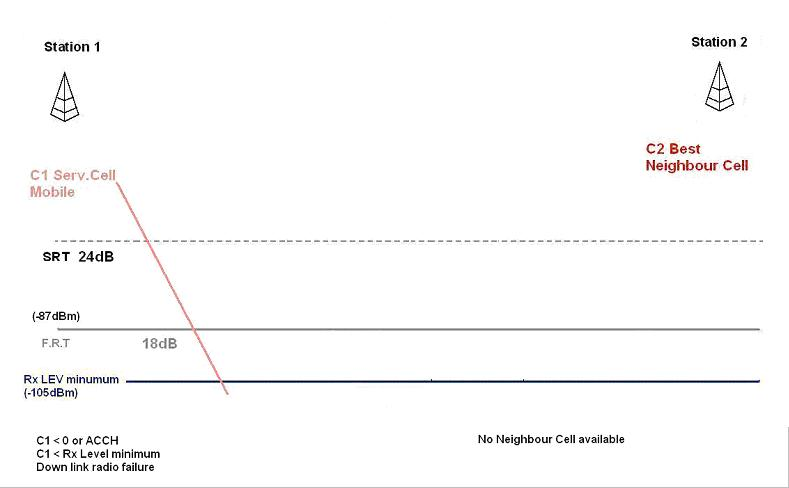
Radio down-link failure

When the FRT threshold is breached, the MS is in a situation where it is essential to relinquish (or abandon) the serving cell and obtain another of at least usable quality. That is to say, the mobile station is aware that the radio signal is decaying rapidly, and must cell reselect rapidly, before communications are terminated because of radio link failure. When the mobile station radio-signal breaches the minimum receive level, the radio is no longer in a position to maintain acceptable communications for the user, and the radio link is broken.

Radio link failure: (C1 < 0). Using the suggested values, this would be satisfied with the serving cell level below −105 dBm. Cell reselection procedures are then activated in order to find a suitable radio base station.

Infrastructure TETRA parameters guide (Note: Data to be verified)
Coverage	Parameter	Distance (km)	Type of communication
City	< 4	< 8	Pedestrian/metro
Sub-urban	10–18	20–36	Bus/train
Countryside	18–31	36–62	Inter-regional train
In Air	> 32	> 64	In flight

== Man-machine interface (MMI) ==
=== Virtual MMI for terminals ===
Any given TETRA radio terminal using Java (Java ME/CLDC) based technology, provides the end user with the communication rights necessary to fulfil his or her work role on any short duration assignment.

For dexterity, flexibility, and evolution ability, the public transportation radio engineering department, have chosen to use the open sources, Java language specification administered by Sun and the associated work groups in order to produce a transport application tool kit.

Service acquisition admits different authorised agents to establish communication channels between different services by calling the service identity, and without possessing the complete knowledge of the ISSI, GSSI, or any other TETRA related communication establishment numbering plan. Service acquisition is administered through a communication rights centralised service or roll allocation server, interfaced into the TETRA core network.

In summary, the TETRA MMI aims are to:

- Allow any given agent while in exercise, to exploit any given radio terminal without materiel constraint.
- Provide specific transportation application software to the end-user agents (service acquisition, fraud, and aggression control).

This transport application tool-kit has been produced with TETRA communication technology and assures for the public transport application requirements for the future mentioned hereafter.

The home (main) menu presents the end user with three possibilities:

1. Service acquisition
2. Status SDS
3. End-user parameters

Service acquisition provides a means of virtually personalising the end user to any given radio terminal and onto TETRA network for the duration the end user conserves the terminal under his possession.

Status SDS provides the end user with a mechanism for generating a 440 Hz repeating tone that signals a fraud occurrence to members within the same (dynamic or static) Group Short Subscriber Identity (GSSI) or to a specific Individual Short Subscriber Identity (ISSI) for the duration of the assignment (an hour, a morning patrol or a given short period allocated to the assignment). The advantage being that each of the end users may attach themselves to any given terminal, and group for short durations without requiring any major reconfiguration by means of radio software programming tools. Similarly, the aggression feature functions, but with a higher tone frequency (880 Hz), and with a quicker repetitious nature, so to highlight the urgency of the alert.

The parameters tab provides an essential means to the terminal end-user allowing them to pre-configure the target (preprogrammed ISSI or GSSI ) destination communication number. With this pre-programmed destination number, the end-user shall liaise with the destination radio terminal or roll allocation server, and may communicate, in the group, or into a dedicated server to which the service acquisition requests are received, preprocessed, and ultimately dispatched though the TETRA core network. This simplifies the reconfiguration or recycling configuration process allowing flexibility on short assignments.

The parameters tab also provides a means of choosing between preselected tones to match the work group requirements for the purposes of fraud and aggression alerts. A possibility of selecting any given key available from the keypad to serve as an aggression or fraud quick key is also made possible though the transport application software tool kit. It is recommend to use the asterisk and the hash keys for the fraud and aggression quick keys respectively. For the fraud and aggression tones, it is also recommend to use 440 Hz slow repeating tone (blank space 500 milli-seconds) and 880 Hz fast repeating tone (blank space 250 milliseconds) respectively. The tone options are as follows: 440 Hz, 620 Hz, 880 Hz, and 1060 Hz.

The parameters page provides an aid or help menu and the last tab within parameters describes briefly the tool kit the version and the history of the transport application tool kit to date.

=== TETRA Enhanced Data Service (TEDS) ===
The TETRA Association, working with ETSI, developed the TEDS standard, a wideband data solution, which enhances TETRA with a much higher capacity and throughput for data. In addition to those provided by TETRA, TEDS uses a range of adaptive modulation schemes and a number of different carrier sizes from 25 kHz to 150 kHz. Initial implementations of TEDS will be in the existing TETRA radio spectrum, and will likely employ 50 kHz channel bandwidths as this enables an equivalent coverage footprint for voice and TEDS services. TEDS performance is optimised for wideband data rates, wide area coverage and spectrum efficiency.

Advances in DSP technology have led to the introduction of multi-carrier transmission standards employing QAM modulation. WiMAX, Wi-Fi and TEDS standards are part of this family.

Refer also to:

- JSR-118;
- Mobile Information Device Profile, JSR-37;
- Wireless Messaging API, JSR120;
- Connected Limited Device Configuration, JSR-139; and
- Technology for the Wireless Industry, JTWI-185.

== Comparison to Project 25 ==
Project 25 and TETRA are utilised for the public safety Radio network and Private Sector Radio network worldwide however, it has some differences in technical features and capacities.

- TETRA: It is optimized for high population density areas, with spectral efficiency (4 time slots in 25 kHz: four communications channels per 25 kHz channel, an efficient use of spectrum). It is suitable for high population density areas and supports full duplex voice, data and messaging; but, it is generally unavailable for simulcast, VHF band - however particular vendors have introduced Simulcast and VHF into their TETRA platform..
- P25: it is optimized for wider area coverage with low population density, and support for simulcast. however, it is limited to data support. (Phase 1 P25 radio systems operate in a 12.5 kHz analogue, digital or mixed mode, and P25 Phase II will use a 2-timeslot TDMA structure in 12.5 kHz channels.)

Currently, P25 deployed to more than 53 countries and TETRA deployed to more than 114 countries.

== Professional usage ==
At the end of 2009 there were 114 countries using TETRA systems in Europe, Middle East, Africa, Asia Pacific, Caribbean and Latin America.

The TETRA system is in use in the following countries. Only TETRA network infrastructure installations are listed. TETRA being an open standard, each of these networks can use any mix of TETRA mobile terminals from a wide range of suppliers.

Continent	Country	Supplier	Name	Agency	Status
Asia	China mainland	EADS/Cassidian/Airbus	Shenyang Metro	Transport	In use: Line 1 Rolling out: Line 2
Asia	China mainland	DAMM TetraFlex	Guangzhou Electric Power	Utility - Guangzhou Electric Power Emergency Communication	In use 2010
Asia	China mainland	EADS/Cassidian/Airbus	Shenzhen Metro	Transport	Ordered 5/2010
Asia	China mainland	EADS/Cassidian/Airbus	Guangzhou	16th Asian Games in 2010	Ordered 2010
Asia	Hong Kong	EADS/Cassidian/Airbus	Hong Kong International Airport (HKIA)	2008 Beijing Olympics and Paralympic Games (Hong Kong Equestrian Event)	Used from July 2008 to October 2008
Asia	Hong Kong	EADS/Cassidian/Airbus	Hong Kong Fire Services Department	Fire service and ambulance	In use
Asia	Hong Kong	Motorola / Dimetra	Hong Kong Police Force	Police	In use
Asia	Hong Kong	Motorola	Correctional Services Department	Law enforcement	In use
Asia	Hong Kong	Motorola	Immigration Department	Law enforcement	In use
Asia	Hong Kong	Motorola	Mass Transit Railway (MTR)	Transport	In use
Asia	Hong Kong	Motorola / Dimetra	Hong Kong International Airport (HKIA)	Transport	In use since Feb 2009
Asia	Hong Kong	Motorola	CLP Power Hong Kong Limited	Electric	In use
Asia	Hong Kong		Hongkong Electric Co., Limited	Electric	In use
Asia	Hong Kong		Modern Terminals Limited	Container port	In use
Asia	Hong Kong		Hong Kong International Terminals Limited	Container port	In use
Asia	Hong Kong		Liaison Office of the Central People Government in the HKSAR	Diplomacy	In use
Asia	India	Artevea	Military College of Telecommunication Engineering (MCTE)	Indian Army	In use since 2004 at Mhow, Indore, Madhya Pradesh
Asia	India	Motorola / Dimetra	Delhi Metro Rail Corporation Ltd.	Transport	The First TETRA in India, in use since 2002
Asia	India	DAMM TetraFlex / Consort Digital Pvt Ltd	Mumbai Mono Rail, Mumbai Metropolitan Region Development Authority (MMRDA)	Mass transport - India's first monorail project - Mumbai	Awarded 2010
Asia	India	C-DAC	TETRA with Automatic Dial 100 (AD100)	Kerala police	In use by police, Trivandrum city, since 2008
Asia	India	DAMM TetraFlex / Consort Digital Pvt Ltd	Tamil Nadu police	Police and internal security and safety	Awarded 2011
Asia	India	HCL & Motorola	Secure Communication Network	Delhi government	Integrated Communication System used by various departments under government of Delhi and Delhi police since 2010.
Asia	India	DAMM TetraFlex / Consort Digital Pvt Ltd	Gas Authority of India Limited (GAIL)	Gas pipeline - safety, telemetry and security	Awarded 2011
Asia	India	THALES Portugal S A & Motorola	With PSTN call integration designed by Thales Group for BMRCL	BMRCL Bangalore Metro Corporation Limited	Transport, in use since March 2011
Asia	India	Sepura & Rohde and Schwarz	TETRA with Automatic Dial 100 (AD100)	Gurgaon police	In use by police, Gurgaon city Since 2009. In Salem from August 2011.
Asia	India	Sepura & Rohde and Schwarz	TETRA with Automatic Dial 100 (AD100)	Faridabad police	In use by police, Faridabad city, since 2012
Asia	Indonesia	Motorola / Dimetra, installed & maintained by PT. Mobilkom Telekomindo	SCADA PT. Chevron Pacific Indonesia	HOOU	In use since 2009 at Duri, Riau, Indonesia.
Asia	Indonesia	Rohde & Schwarz / Accessnet - T	Anti Corruption Agency	Anti Corruption Agency	Operational
Asia	Indonesia	Rohde & Schwarz / Accessnet-T	Jakarta State Government Network	Jakarta Capital City Jakarta	Operational, Installed since 2007
Asia	Kazakhstan	HMF Smart Solutions / ACCESSNET®-T IP	Kazakhstan Railways	Public Transport	In use
Asia	Macao	Artevea	Melco-Crown Entertainment	Casino-Hotels: Altira (formerly Crown Macau), and City of Dreams	In use since 2007
Asia	Macao	Motorola / Dimetra	Forças de Segurança de Macau	All emergency services	In use
Asia	Malaysia	EADS/Cassidian/Airbus	Segi Maju (SEGI)	Public operator	In use
Asia	Malaysia	Motorola / Dimetra	Sungai Buloh–Kajang line.	Transport	In use
Asia	Malaysia	Motorola / Dimetra	Sungai Buloh–Serdang–Putrajaya line.	Transport	Operational 2021
Asia	Maldives	Motorola / Dimetra	Maldives Police Service (MPS)	Police	In use
Asia	Pakistan	Motorola / Dimetra	NITRS Nationwide Integrated Trunk Radio System Project for Police under Ministry of Interior, Government of Pakistan	Police	In use Since 2009
Asia	Philippines	Motorola Dimetra/GA Technology and Systems Inc.	Shell Exploration	Oil and gas	In use October 2013, Phase 2 On Shore Gas Plant for Implementation
Asia	Philippines	Motorola Dimetra/GA Technology and Systems Inc.	Globe Telecom	Telecommunications carrier	Implementation on Going Project Finish Dec 2013
Asia	Philippines	Rohill (TetraNode) SynTech Systems Inc.	Meralco	Electric company	Implemented Nov 2014
Asia	Philippines	Rohill (TetraNode) SynTech Systems Inc.	Manila Line 2	Transport (Manila Light Rail Transit System Line 2)	Implemented Oct 2015
Asia	Singapore	Leonardo	Singapore Metro	TETRA network for Cross Island Line	Awarded in 2025 Currently in deployment
Asia		Leonardo	Singapore Metro	TETRA network for Jurong Line	Awarded in 2021 Currently in deployment
Asia	South Korea	EADS/Cassidian/Airbus	Korea Electric Power Corporation (KEPCO)	Electricity	In use
Asia	Taiwan	Leonardo	Taipei Rapid Transit Corporation Metro Service	TETRA network for Taipei Metro	Awarded in 2024 Currently in deployment
Asia	Taiwan		Taiwan Railway	Transport	In use
Asia	Taiwan		Taiwan High Speed Rail	Transport	In use
Asia	Taiwan		Taipei Metro	Transport	In use
Asia	Taiwan		Kaohsiung Mass Rapid Transit	Transport	In use
Asia	Taiwan		Coast Guard Administration (Taiwan)	Republic of China Armed Forces	In use
	Thailand	Leonardo	Bangkok Metro	TETRA network for Orange Line	Awarded in 2025 Currently in deployment
Africa	Algeria	Rohde & Schwarz	Sonatrach	Oil & gas company	In use since 2003.
Africa	Algeria	Sepura	Sonelgaz	Power utility	In use.
Africa	Egypt	Motorolasolutions Dimetra IP	MERC	Ministry of Interior, Suez Canal Authority, Oil & GAS and commercial users	In use, Nationwide
Africa	Morocco	Rohill	ADM	Highway authority	Rolling out / Almost completed.
Africa	Nigeria	Dizengoff/Motorola IL (Dimetra IP)	Nigeria LNG	Nigeria LNG Oil & gas	Since 2006
Africa	Nigeria	Cisan International Limited/Rohill (TetraNode)	Mobil Ng	Mobila Ng Oil	Since 2014
Africa	Nigeria	Dizengoff/Motorola IL (Compact-Tetra IP)	Shell Ng	Shell Ng Oil	Since 2010
Africa	Nigeria	Satcomm Integrated Resources LLC SatCom IRL/EADS		Nigerian Ports Authority, Nigeria (rolling out)	Rolling out
Africa	Nigeria	Rohill (TetraNode)	Bayelsa State	Government	Since June 2012
Africa	Nigeria	Briscoe Technologies / Hytera Accessnet	Lagos / Abuja / Port Harcourt	Oil industry / airports / security companies	In use Since 2006
Africa	Namibia	Artevea	Namibian Police Force	Police	In use, nationwide
Africa	South Africa	HMF Smart Solutions / ACCESSNET®-T IP	Sasol	Oil & Gas	In use
Africa	South Africa	Motorola Solutions DIMETRA	Police, traffic police	SAPS Gauteng	Gauteng province
Africa	South Africa	Motorola Solutions DIMETRA	Municipality, fire, and ambulance.	City of Cape Town	Cape Peninsula
Africa	South Africa	Rohill (TetraNode)	Mbombela Local Municipality	Nelspruit, Mpumalanga	Complete
Africa	South Africa	Rohill (TetraNode)	City Power	Johannesburg, Gauteng	Complete
Africa	South Africa	Rohill (TetraNode)	City of Tshwane Municipality	Pretoria, Gauteng	Complete
Africa	South Africa	Rohill (TetraNode)	Rustenburg Platinum Mine	Potgietersrus, Limpopo	Complete
Africa	Sudan	Artevea	Ministry of Interior	Police	In use, nationwide
Africa	Uganda	HMF Smart Solutions / ACCESSNET®-T IP	Entebbe international Airport	Airports	In use
Europe	Austria	Motorola / Dimetra	TETRON	Police, fire, ambulance, and local train company.	In use
Europe	Austria	HMF Smart Solutions / ACCESSNET®-T IP	Red Bull Arena, Salzburg	Events	In use
Europe	Belgium	Airbus/Since 1998	nl:A.S.T.R.I.D. fr:A.S.T.R.I.D.	Police, fire, ambulance, customs, coast guard, hospitals, Red Cross, department of Justice, utility companies, airports, ports, lifeguard service, military.	Nationwide network
Europe	Belgium	Rohde & Schwarz since 2011/ ACCESSNET-T	ENTROPIA DIGITAL	Commercial & private security users.	Flanders & Brussels
Europe	Croatia	Motorola / Dimetra	MUPNet	Police, fire brigades, ambulance service	Nationwide coverage (99,5%) in use
Europe	Denmark	DAMM TetraFlex	DONG Energy Power Plants - 11 Power Plants across Denmark	Utilities - safety, security, telemetry	Awarded 2009
Europe	Denmark	Motorola / Dimetra	SINE	All emergency authorities, incl. police, fire, and ambulance.	Nationwide coverage (99,5%) in use
Europe	Estonia	EADS/Cassidian/Airbus	ESTER	Police and border guard, fire, ambulance, and customs	Nationwide network
Europe	Finland	Nokia; now EADS/Cassidian/Airbus	VIRVE	Police, fire, ambulance, customs, defence forces, and border guard	Nationwide network
Europe	Finland		HelenNet	Energy company Helsingin Energia, tram operator HKL-Raitioliikenne, and several bus operators on HRTA's lines. Also used by some security guard companies, mostly securing HRTA's transport. Available for lease for various short-term uses.	In use, covers greater Helsinki region
Europe	Germany	HMF Smart Solutions / ACCESSNET®-T IP	Stadtwerke Münster	Utilities	In use
Europe	Germany	HMF Smart Solutions / ACCESSNET®-T IP	Würzburg Tramway	Public Transport	In use
Europe	Germany	HMF Smart Solutions / ACCESSNET®-T IP	MIBRAG	Oil & Gas	In use
Europe	Germany	Airbus	BOSNET	Police, fire, ambulance, customs, and coast guard.	Nationwide
Europe	Germany	DAMM TetraFlex	Global Tech 1 Offshore Wind GmbH.	Utility Windfarm - Telemetry, Security and Safety Critical communications	Awarded 2012
Europe	Germany	Hytera	Bremen Tramway	Transport	In use since 2018
Europe	Greece	HMF Smart Solutions / Network Business Solutions	Piraeus Container Terminal	Ports	In use
Europe	Greece	Motorola / Dimetra	COSMOTE TETRA Services; Formerly branded OTElink (2009).	Business critical, public protection & disaster relief (PPDR) communications, public utility and oil-gas companies, seaports, airports, public and private transportation companies, public and private sector security personnel, other. Data applications nationwide including SCADA, AVL, M2M.	Extensive nationwide footprint, in use since 2002
Europe	Greece	SEPURA	Teltronic	Police, Fire Services, Coast Guard	Nationwide roll-out in progress.
Europe	Hungary	Pro-M Ltd.	EDR (acronym for Unified Digital Radiosystem)	Ambulance, army, Central Office for Administrative and Electronic Public Services, Civil Defence, Hungarian Prison Service, Hungarian Customs and Finance Guard, disaster management, fire, Hungarian Secret Services, Ministry of Environment and Water, and police	In-use
Europe	Hungary	HMF Smart Solutions / ACCESSNET®-T IP	Budapesti Közlekedési Vállalat (BKV)	Public Transport	In use
Europe	Iceland	Motorola / Dimetra	TETRA Iceland	Police, fire services, ambulances, Search and Rescue units, Red Cross, bus service (Strætó Bs.), The Icelandic National Broadcasting Service, most utility companies, municipalities and private users such as excursion companies.	In-use
Europe	Ireland	Motorola / Dimetra	TETRA Ireland	An Garda Siochana, HSE National Ambulance Service, Irish Prison Service, Irish Naval Service, Customs & Excise, civil defense (only a few units), Irish Coast Guard, mountain rescue (only a few units), Order of Malta Ambulance Corps, Irish Red Cross, St John Ambulance, National Emergency Office, Port of Cork, Revenue Commissioners and Office of Public Works.	Nationwide roll-out network complete. The fire services are planning to implement in the coming years. As of July 2011, TETRA Ireland now operates the national Paging System.
Europe	Italy	HMF Smart Solutions/ Mobilcom	Priolo Servizi Consortium/Sicilia	Oil & Gas	In use
Europe	Italy	Leonardo	MoI	Completion of the National PSS network (PIT)	Awarded in 2025 Currently in deployment
Europe	Italy	Leonardo	Milan-Cortina Foundation	TETRA network for organisation and security services of Milano-Cortina Winter Olympics 2026	Awarded in 2025
Europe	Italy	DAMM TetraFlex	Lombardi Ambulance Emergency Services	Ambulance - security, safety, communication	Awarded 2010
Europe	Italy	SELEX ELSAG	Rete Interpolizie	Polizia di Stato (Italian state police), Carabinieri (military police), Guardia di Finanza (financial police), Polizia Penitenziaria (prison police), and Corpo Forestale Italiano (Italian forest brigades)	Rolling out
Europe	Italy	DAMM TetraFlex	Rome International Airport	Airport - security, safety, commercial, fire, customs, police	Awarded 2009
Europe	Latvia	Artevea	Ventamonjaks Serviss Ltd, Ventspils	Oil and gas	In use since 2007
Europe	Latvia	Motorola / Dimetra (SIA DAN Communications)	Riga Municipal Police	Local law enforcement in Riga	Ordered in 2016
Europe	Latvia	Motorola / Dimetra (SIA DAN Communications)	State Police	National law enforcement	
Europe	Luxembourg	Motorola / Dimetra	Renita	Government; police, fire brigade, ambulance services and others	Start building 2014, Operational since 2015
Europe	Luxembourg	Motorola / Dimetra	ConnectCom	Commercial network	Operational
Europe	Luxembourg	Motorola / Dimetra	ConnectCom	Public Transport, city of Luxembourg	Operational
Europe	Luxembourg	Motorola / Dimetra	ConnectCom	European Union	Operational
Europe	North Macedonia	HMF Smart Solutions / ACCESSNET®-T IP	MoI	Public Safety	In use
Europe	North Macedonia	Hytera	Fire brigade of city Skopje	Fire department	In use
Europe	Malta	Marconi		Civil Protection Force	July 2001
Europe	Monaco	Motorola		Sûreté Publique (Police), Carabiniers (military police), fire brigades, ambulance	Nationwide coverage (including indoor public buildings)
Europe	Montenegro	Motorola / Dimetra	Wireless Montenegro d.o.o.	Police, military, fire brigades, ambulance	In use since November 2012 Podgorica area only. Rolling out elsewhere.
Europe	Netherlands	HMF Smart Solutions / ACCESSNET®-T IP	C2000	Police, fire, and ambulance	Nationwide network
Europe	Netherlands	Motorola / Dimetra	ENTROPIA DIGITAL	Commercial users.	National license
Europe	Netherlands	Motorola / Dimetra until 2019 ?, Hytera AccessNet-T since 2019 ??	HTM	Public transport The Hague	Regional network
Europe	Netherlands	Motorola / Dimetra	CCTN / GVB	Public transport Amsterdam	Regional network
Europe	Netherlands	Rohill	RET	Public transport Rotterdam	Regional network
Europe	Netherlands	Rohill	Schiphol Airport	Schiphol Group, KLM, and other businesses	Local network
Europe	Netherlands	Sepura	TATA steel Europe	Hoogovens	Local network
Europe	Norway	Motorola / Dimetra	Norwegian Public Safety Radio	Police, fire, ambulance, civil defense and search and rescue	Nationwide rollout completed September 2015
Europe		Motorola	Ruter/Sporveien	Public Transport, Oslo	Established before 2003
Europe	Portugal	Motorola	SIRESP	Police (PSP and GNR), fire, ambulance and civil protection	Nationwide roll-out, in use since 2007
Europe	Portugal	Motorola	Lisbon International Airport (LPPT)	Transport - Ground operations	Local Network
Europe	Poland	Motorola	Ministry of Interior, Polish army, and Warsaw police	Police, fire, public transport, airports, and army.	In use since 2000
Europe	Poland	HMF Smart Solutions / ACCESSNET®-T IP	Chopin Airport, Warsaw	Airports	In use
Europe	Poland	Rohill (TetraNode)	Szczecin, Warsaw and Kraków police	Roll-out ongoing.	Modern IP based TETRA solution for 3 cities
Europe	Romania	Motorola / Dimetra	Special Telecommunications Service (STS)	Police, fire, and search and rescue	Nationwide
Europe	Romania	Motorola	Dimetra	Ministry of Administration and Interior (MAI) / Romanian Border Police (RBP)	In use since 2008 for police, emergency and search and rescue agencies from Romanian border counties-wide
Europe	Romania	EADS/Cassidian/Airbus	TETRA EADS	Ministry of Administration and Interior (MAI) / Romanian Border Police (RBP)	In use since 2010 for police, emergency and search and rescue agencies from Romanian border counties-wide
Europe		Hytera/Motorola/Sepura	HamTetra Network Romania	Amateur radio users engage in both DMO (Direct Mode Operation) and TMO (Trunked Mode Operation) modes, both within the country and globally, connecting through gateways such as Zello and SVXLink. Ham Tetra Romania Network Architecture was developed and published along with users map and equipment used on the YO8TEH website	Tetra gear in ham radio was initially introduced by YO8TEH in 2014 in DMO (Direct Mode Operation). Subsequently, it evolved into gateways through platforms like Zello and Teamspeak. In 2021, a part of the system was split and migrated to svxlink, along with its classic application. The first Tetra Repeater for Ham Radio use in Romania was licensed under the call sign YO8TEH-1, while the second TMO repeater was licensed under the call sign YO8Q.
Europe	Russia	DAMM TetraFlex	Moscow Metro (second most heavily used rapid transport system in the world)	Transport - rail - telemetry, safety, security, police, ambulance, fire	Awarded 2011
Europe	Russia	Sepura	Unified system of operational trunking radio (Единая Система Оперативной Транкинговой Радиосвязи)	Fire, ambulance and partially, police	Launched in 2008
Europe	Russia	DAMM TetraFlex	Russias Kaliningrad Power Plant.	Utility power plant - safety and security - telemetry and commercial agents	Awarded 2009
Europe	Russia	DAMM TetraFlex	St Petersburg and North West Russia.	Government - ambulance and emergency services, police, healthcare facilities, utility services, St. Petersburg Authorities and the regional civil defense	Awarded 2011
Europe	Serbia	Motorola / Dimetra	Ministry of Interior	Police, fire brigades, ambulance	Fully rolled out as of 2009
Europe	Slovenia	Selex/OTE/Marconi	Ministry of Interior	Police	In central Slovenia
Europe	Spain	Motorola	Basque Country	Mainly police	In use since 2006
Europe	Spain	Teltronic	Basque Country	Mainly municipalities and public services	In use since 2009
Europe	Spain	EADS/Cassidian/Airbus	Catalonia	Police, fire brigades, civil protection, ambulances, forest guards, water agency, gas company, road maintenance service and other public agencies	In use since 2006
Europe	Sweden	SAAB, Cassidian, Eltel Networks	RAKEL	Managed by the Civil Contingencies Agency - MSB. For use by the emergency services and others in the fields of civil protection, public safety and security, emergency medical services and healthcare, road services, nuclear facilities.	In operation, covering 99.8% of Sweden's population and 95% of its territory
Europe	Sweden	Motorola	Tetra	Stockholm public transport: used by transport security officers for dispatch internal communications, Transport Police ("Tunnelbanepolisen") and other police forces for liaison with transport officials. Roll-out stage for train operations on underground.	In operation / roll-out
Europe	Sweden	Rohde & Schwarz	Got1	Got1 is a modern IP based Tetra network used in the west parts of Sweden. Mainly in the Gothenburg region. With customers like SKF and Volvo Trucks.	In operation
Europe	United Kingdom	Motorola / Dimetra / Sepura	Airwave	Police, fire, NHS ambulance services, Border Force, immigration enforcement, some armed forces, National Highways traffic officers, civil contingency services, HM Coastguard, St John Ambulance, St John Cymru, British Red Cross, Highland Council, and miscellaneous emergency services.	Full emergency service rollout complete
Europe	United Kingdom	Hytera	Tetra	Prison Service	Operational
Europe	United Kingdom	Motorola / Dimetra	Connect	Transport for London (London Underground)	Used by all Tube staff and relaying Airwave for BTP when underground
Europe	United Kingdom	AirRadio AR-en		Use by some services at some major airports	(Heathrow, Birmingham, Manchester, Glasgow, Aberdeen)
Middle East	Israel	Motorola	Mountain Rose	Israel Defense Forces (IDF)	In use by IDF, country-wide
Middle East	Turkey	DAMM TetraFlex	Alacer Gold Mine	Mining - safety and security critical communications	Awarded 2012
Middle East	United Arab Emirates	EADS/Cassidian/Airbus	Nedaa	Police, emergency services, and professional communications	Dubai, Sharjah, Ajman, Umm Al-Qaiwain, Ras Al-Khaimah, and Fujairah operational
Middle East	United Arab Emirates	EADS/Cassidian/Airbus	Polikom	Police, emergency services, and professional communications	Abu Dhabi
Middle East	Qatar	HMF Smart Solutions / ACCESSNET®-T IP	Ooredoo, nationwide network	Operator/Industry	In use
Middle East	Qatar	EADS/Cassidian/Airbus		Ministry of Interior, army, police, air force search and rescue, EMS (medical).	Initial use for the 15th Asian Games all games venues inclusive of transportation routes for "blue light" services, later extended to cover the State of Qatar. Known as Qatar Secure TETRA Radio System (QSTRS).
	Saudi Arabia	Leonardo	Riyadh Metro	Extension of existing TETRA network for Riyadh Metro	Awarded in 2025 Currently in deployment
Latin America	Mexico	Rohde & Schwarz / Sepura	Mazatlán, Sinaloa Police & Emergency Services	Police, emergency services operational	Operational
South America	Argentina	HMF Smart Solutions / ACCESSNET®-T IP	Mendoza	Public Safety	In use
South America	Brazil	Motorola	América Latina Logística	Railroad, communication and licensing.	Operational
South America	Brazil	Teltronic / Motorola	Polícia Rodoviária Federal	Road patrol, country-wide	In operation / national roll-out in progress
South America	Brazil	Teltronic / Motorola	12 states	Public Safety Agencies	In operation, 600+ stationary stations.
South America	Chile	HMF Smart Solutions / ACCESSNET®-T IP	Gendarmeria de Chile	Public Safety	Awarded 2025
South America	Peru	HMF Smart Solutions / ACCESSNET®-T IP	National Police and district units of Pucallpa	Public Safety	In use
Caribbean	Windward Islands and Leeward Islands	Rohill	Zenitel, C3 since 2005	Police, emergency services, oil and professional communications	Aruba, Bonaire, Curaçao, Sint Maarten, Saint Martin, Saba, Sint Eustatius, and Anguilla operational
Caribbean	Dominican Republic	Hytera US / HMF Smart Solutions		Public Safety	In use
Oceania	Australia	DAMM TetraFlex	BHP Billiton	Temco Smeltering Tasmania - mining, commercial, safety, security	Awarded 2011
Oceania	Australia	DAMM TetraFlex	Rio Tinto	Western Australia Mining	Awarded 2009
Oceania	Australia	Rohill Tetra	Inpex	Ichthys LNG	Infrastructure
Oceania	Australia	Rohill Tetra	BHP Billiton	Macedon Gas	Infrastructure
Oceania	Australia	DAMM TetraFlex	Origin Energy (APLNG)	Kordia Solutions	Australian Pacific Project
Oceania	Australia	Rohill Tetra	Goldlinq	Goldcoast rail	Goldcoast infrastructure
Oceania	Australia	DAMM TetraFlex	Fortescue Metals group	Open cut mining	Awarded 2011
Oceania	Australia	DAMM TetraFlex	Gorgon LNG Project, Chevron, Australia	Gas and pipelines	Awarded 2011
Oceania	Australia	Motorola	BHP Billiton	Pyrenees FPSO	Awarded 2016
Oceania	Australia	Motorola	Zeon	Local government	Operational across Brisbane City Council, including the Brisbane State Emergency Service Unit
Oceania	Australia	DAMM TetraFlex	Australian Submarine Co	Military, defence, comms, safety, security	Awarded 2012
Oceania	Australia	Motorola	Zeon	Tertiary education	Used by Queensland University of Technology security staff.
Oceania	Australia	Sepura			Being used by several Mining Operations throughout Western Australia and Queensland - Terminals only - No Infrastructure.
Oceania	New Zealand	DAMM TetraFlex	BHP One Steel	Aluminium Smelter - ore production - safety, security, operations	Awarded 2012
Oceania	New Zealand	Kordia	KorKor	Airports	Used by Wellington International Airport, Air New Zealand
Oceania	New Zealand	Kordia	KorKor	Councils	Used by Hutt City, Auckland Transport
Oceania	New Zealand	Teltronic	Widarcom	Commercial network launched 2008	Used by University of Auckland, Westpac

== Amateur radio usage ==
In the past decade, TETRA has seen an uptick in usage in the amateur radio community. The perceived higher audio quality compared to other digital voice modes, capacity for packet data, SDS, single frequency DMO repeaters, close proximity of the UHF (430-440MHz) amateur radio band and full duplex audio in TMO are motivating arguments to experiment contacts with this technology.

Multiple constraints have to be noted when using TETRA for amateur radio service:

- In most countries, encryption cannot be used.
- Most older (pre-2010) terminals don't cover the Region 1 amateur radio frequency range (430–440) natively, and must be modified via software with a possible impact on RF performance.

Multiple amateur DMO and TMO networks are established throughout Europe.

Additionally, an open-source project aims to create a complete SDR-based TETRA stack, with a working DMO repeater proof of concept.

== See also ==
- Digital mobile radio, a TDMA digital radio standard from ETSI
- Digital private mobile radio (dPMR), an FDMA digital radio standard from ETSI
- NXDN, a two-way FDMA digital radio protocol from Icom and JVC Kenwood
- P25 (Project 25), a TIA APCO standard (USA)
- TETRAPOL (previously MATRA)
