= TETRAPOL =

TETRAPOL (short for TErrestrial TRunked RAdio POLice) is a digital professional mobile radio standard, as defined by the TETRAPOL Publicly Available Specification (PAS), used by professional user groups such as public safety, military, industry and transportation organizations throughout the world. Airbus Defence and Space is the main supplier of this technology.

== Description ==
TETRAPOL is a fully digital, FDMA, professional mobile radio system for closed user groups, standardizing the whole radio network from data and voice terminal via base stations to switching equipment, including interfaces to the Public switched telephone network and data networks. End-to-end encryption is an integral part of the standard.

Tetrapol Publicly Available Specifications (registration required) has detailed information and an overview picture.

== History ==
Matra/EADS developed TETRAPOL and delivered an operational digital trunked radio system at an early date. Among the first users was the French National Gendarmerie in 1988 for its RUBIS system.

TETRAPOL currently has 80 networks deployed in 34 countries.

Countries with TETRAPOL networks include: France, Germany, Switzerland, Mexico, Spain, Brazil, Czech Republic, Slovakia, Djibouti, and Singapore.

EADS (Connexity) and Siemens (S-PRO) are among the major manufacturers of professional radio systems based on the TETRAPOL specification.

In 2012 the Brazilian federal police bought a network to use during the FIFA World Cup.

== Alternative Solutions ==
TETRA is an open standard by ETSI. TETRA is a more recent standard than Tetrapol, taking over concepts from cell phones. It is favored in Europe for its extensibility and lower entry barrier for competitors in the market. Networks can be found worldwide. The UK Home Office stipulated in the 1990s that TETRA systems should be used. Matra Communications SAS brought a legal case to the UK High Court in 1998 challenging Home Office policy and arguing that a public procurement procedure undertaken for the acquisition of a TETRA system denied Matra a chance to win the contract. Proceedings were issued after a TETRA contract had been awarded but the court held that the case should have been brought within three months of when the grounds for bringing legal action first arose, which was when the tender was advertised, and therefore the proceedings were time-barred.

dPMR is an open standard by ETSI. dPMR is a more recent standard than TETRA. It offers voice and data and a better spectrum efficiency than TETRA. It can also be used in unlicensed 446 MHz spectrum.

DMR is a limited open digital mobile radio standard defined by ETSI and used in commercial products around the world. It's also seen widespread success within the ham radio community mainly due to low costs.

P25 is an open standard by the Telecommunications Industry Association (TIA). The system is favored in North America for its upgrade option on existing analogue radio networks in the area. Other networks can be found worldwide (South and Central America, Asia, Europe, Middle East, Oceania and Africa).
