= Sepura =

British telecommunications equipment company

- Type: Limited
- Industry: Telecommunications equipment
- Predecessor: Pye
- Founded: 18 March 2002
- Headquarters: Cambridge, United Kingdom
- Key people: Steve Barber
- Products: SC20 TETRA Hand-portable radio SC21 Compact TETRA Hand-portable Radio; SCG22 TETRA Mobile Terminal; SCU3 Broadband Vehicle Device; STP9 Series TETRA Hand-portable Radios; STP8X Series Intrinsically safe TETRA Hand-Portable Radios; Accessories TETRA Radio Apps
- Number of employees: 250
- Website: www.sepura.com

Sepura Limited is a British telecommunications equipment provider that develops and supplies radio terminals, accessories and software applications for business and mission critical communications. The company specialises in Terrestrial Trunked Radio (TETRA) and LTE (telecommunication) technology.

Headquartered in Cambridge, UK, Sepura has partners supplying the Professional mobile radio market in many countries. Sepura products are used in public safety (including police, fire service and ambulance), public transport, commercial and military sectors.

== History ==
Sepura originated in the Pye company, founded in Cambridge in 1896. William George Pye, a trained instrument maker working at Cambridge University Cavendish Laboratory, set up his own business making scientific instruments. He soon built up an international customer base and a reputation for high quality products.

During the First World War Sepura began developing and manufacturing military equipment but after 1921, business began to slow and Pye turned its attention to designing the first commercially successful radio – the ‘700 series’.

Pye also had an interest in television, and in 1930 started developing TV sets and cathode ray tubes. The high point of Pye pre-World War II TV development came with the introduction of the Model 915 TV receiver. By 1939, a full-scale production line had been set up in Cambridge.

With the arrival of the Second World War, UK TV broadcasting was suspended, and the production of the 45 MHz Pye Model 915 TV receiver ceased. Pye then turned its attention to designing and producing radar and wireless equipment for the British Military.

As a developer and manufacturer, Pye produced:

- Domestic radios (1924)
- Televisions (1935)
- Military radios (1939)
- Car radios (1947)
- Police radios (1949)

The mobile radio division of the company, Pye Telecommunications, was taken over by Philips in 1966. By the mid-1990s Philips had decided to pull out of non-core business areas and in 1996 Simoco acquired the Philips PMR business. Sepura was founded in 2002 when it acquired the assets of the TETRA radio business from Simoco.

The following decade saw the TETRA standard gradually adopted, while Sepura saw its business expand from its core UK-based public safety organisations to an international market including oil and gas, transport markets, utilities and mining.

Sepura was listed on the London Stock Exchange in 2007 and in 2012, the year of its 10th anniversary, the company announced that it had shipped its millionth radio. In the same year, it acquired Austrian infrastructure provider 3T Communications (now Sepura Systems).

In 2013, the company acquired Helsinki-based applications developer, Portalify and launched a range of Digital Mobile Radio (DMR) products, covering UHF and VHF frequency bands. The following year, Sepura acquired Fylde Micro, pioneers in radio trunking, enabling DMR Tier III to be offered as part of their portfolio. 2015 saw the acquisition of Teltronic, a Professional Mobile Radio company, based in Zaragoza, Spain.

In 2016 Sepura ran into financial trouble a result of the acquisition of Teltronic and alleged delay of expected orders. The company incurred a considerable amount of debt following its acquisition of Teltronic. Net debt rose from just 1.1 Million Pounds in 2015 to 119.4 Million Pounds at the end of the 2016 Financial year - additionally Sepura posted a pre tax 19 Million Pound loss for the same period.

Based on the financial issues, Sepura withdrew its DMR range of radios citing at the 2016 AGM "that the board now believes it will not be possible to achieve further market penetration without significant additional investment."

Sepura's share price on the London Stock Exchange subsequently lost 95% of its value, dropping from 200 pence to a low of just 9.7 pence in a 3-month period between July 2016 and September 2016.

Hytera, a Chinese Radio manufacturer, then entered into talks and due diligence to take over the company in November 2016.

On the 16 December 2016, the Sepura board recommended the shareholders accept a bid of 20 pence per share from Hytera as a cash purchase.

In July 2022, London-based private equity group Epiris acquired Sepura.

Ofcom, Britain's regulator for UK communications industries, in December 2022 fined Sepura £1.5m for a breach of competition law. In 2018 Sepura and Motorola were in competition for a contract to extend the Airwave digital radio system for police, fire and ambulance services. The regulator found that employees of both companies had exchanged text messages about pricing strategy and likely pricing levels for the new contract.

== Acquisitions ==
=== 2012 ===
- 3T Communications, an Austrian infrastructure provider

=== 2013 ===
- Portalify OY, a Finnish applications developer

=== 2014 ===
- Fylde Micro Ltd, a UK-based trunk radio, voice and data systems provider

=== 2015 ===
- Teltronic S.A.U., a Spanish Professional Mobile Radio (PMR) company
