= Jareš =

Jareš (feminine Jarešová) is a Czech surname. Notable people with the surname include:

- Jaroslav Jareš (1930–2016), Czech footballer and manager
- Richard Jareš (born 1981), Czech ice hockey player
