= Jaar (disambiguation) =

Jaar is a town in the Abyan Governorate of southwestern Yemen.

Jaar may also refer to:

- Kiriath-Jearim, a biblical city in the Land of Israel
- Journal of the American Academy of Religion, an American Journal on Religion
- Chhaang, a Nepalese alcoholic beverage

== Persons with the surname ==
- Abubakar Jaar (fl. 1945–1946), guardian and mayor of Padang
- Alfredo Jaar (born 1956), Chilean-born artist, architect, and filmmaker
- Nicolas Jaar (born 1990), American-Chilean musician
- Ricardo Jaar (born 1968), Honduran Academic and Businessman
- Roger Jaar, Haitian businessman
- Salomón Jaar (1962–2010), Honduran politician

== See also ==
- JAARS, a nonprofit organization that provides technical services assisting in Bible translation
- Jar (disambiguation)
