= Dimetra =

Public safety products brand of Motorola

DIMETRA IP is the brand name under which Motorola markets its implementation of the TETRA digital radio communications standard. When Motorola split into Motorola Solutions and Motorola Mobility in 2011, Motorola Solutions retained Dimetra and other public safety brands and products while Motorola Mobility retained smartphones and other consumer products. Both companies continue to share the "Batwings" logo.

== Overview ==
Tetra is a scalable radio network technology used by emergency services, other government agencies and the private sector. Dimetra IP is built around Motorola's IP (Internet Protocol) core technology while Tetra is an open standard maintained by the European Telecommunications Standards Institute. The technology is similar in nature to GSM but operates in a more secure and resilient manner due to capabilities built into the standard.

Motorola's range of TETRA products including Network Infrastructure, Mobile Radios and Services carry the Dimetra brand.

=== Major Dimetra installations by country ===
- Indonesia (PT. Chevron Pacific Indonesia)
- United Kingdom (Airwave)
- Netherlands (C2000) , de-commissioned since 2020
- Portugal (Emergency Network (Police, Medical Emergency Response Units) (Nationwide)
- Taiwan (Taiwan High Speed Rail)
- Hong Kong (Police)
- Pakistan Ministry of Interior (Police)
- India (Delhi Metro)
- Denmark (Nationwide 99.5% coverage)
- China (Shanghai Police)
- Haiti (MINUSTAH)
- Ireland (Garda, Ambulance, Prison, Naval, Customs, Revenue and Public Works) (Nationwide)
- Greece (Police)
- Jersey (case study)
- Israel (Israel Mountain Rose)
- Sri Lanka (NAV)
- Poland (Police in Warsaw, Szczecin, Lodz, Kraków)
- Australia (QGC / Shell / Woodside)
- Australia (Zeon Digital)

=== Countrywide Dimetra installation in various stages of deployment (2007) ===
- Austria
- Norway
- Lithuania
- Australia
- Maldives

=== Countrywide Dimetra installation in various stages of deployment (2010) ===
- Saudi Arabia
- Libya
