= Jarre =

Jarre (French: [ʒaʁ]) is a French surname that may refer to the following notable people:

- Cyrillus Jarre (1878–1952), Franciscan Archbishop in Jinan, China
- Jean-Michel Jarre (born 1948), composer of electronic and new age music, son of Maurice
  - 4422 Jarre, an asteroid named in honor of both Maurice and Jean-Michel Jarre
- Jérôme Jarre (born 1990), French entrepreneur
- Maurice Jarre (1924–2009), film score composer
- Kevin Jarre (1954–2011), American screenwriter, stepbrother of Jean-Michel Jarre
