= Richard Jareš =

Czech ice hockey player

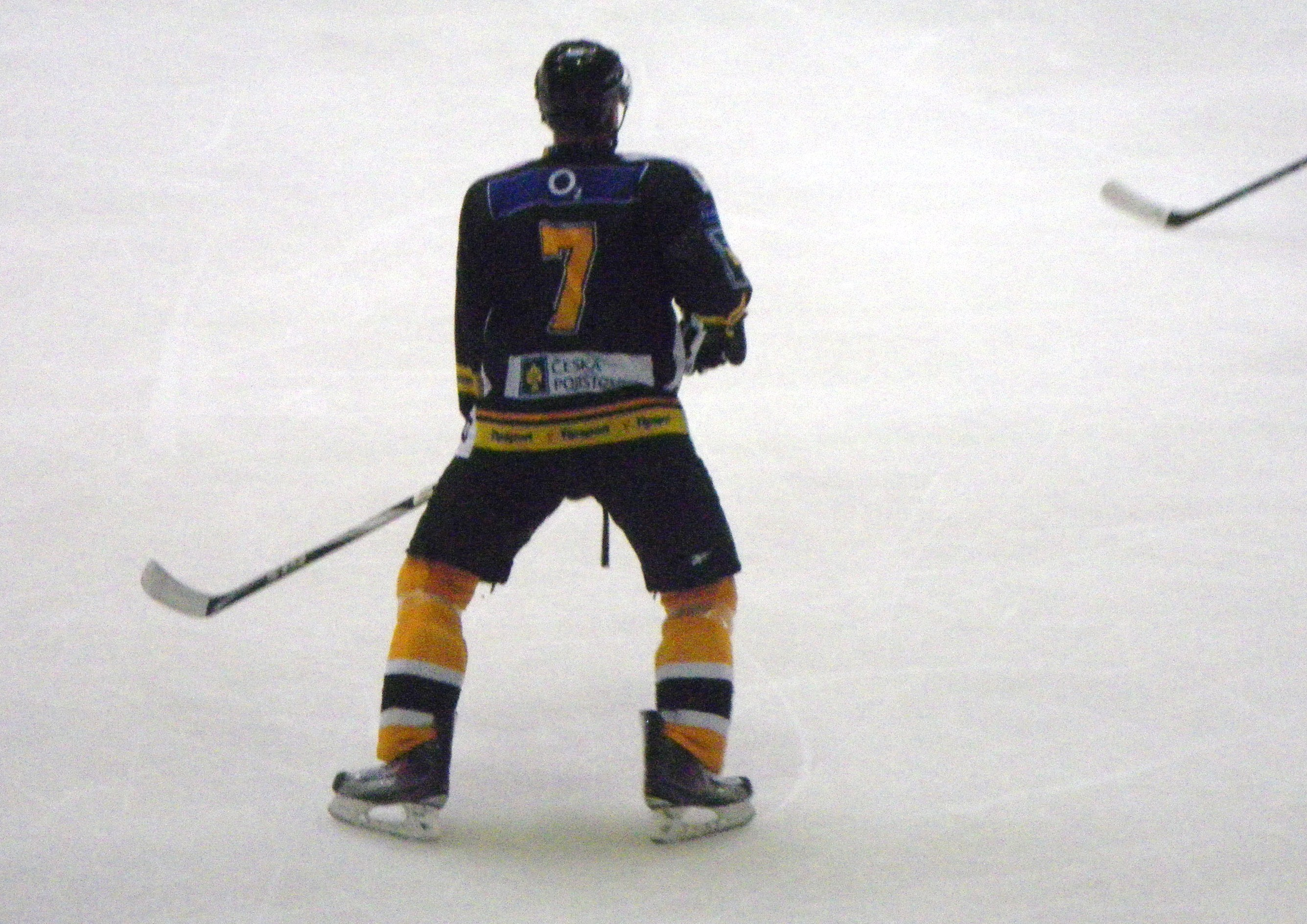
- Born: 23 February 1981 (age 44) Hradec Králové, Czechoslovakia
- Height: 6 ft 1 in (185 cm)
- Weight: 185 lb (84 kg; 13 st 3 lb)
- Position: Defence
- Shot: Left
- Played for: HC Bílí Tygři Liberec; Orli Znojmo; Mountfield HK; HC Litvínov; Iserlohn Roosters; Eispiraten Crimmitschau
- Playing career: 2002–2015

Richard Jareš (born 23 February 1981) is a Czech former professional ice hockey defenceman. He last played with the Iserlohn Roosters of the Deutsche Eishockey Liga (DEL). He has previously played with HC Litvínov in the Czech Extraliga during the 2010–11 season.

== Career statistics ==
			Regular season					Playoffs
Season	Team	League	GP	G	A	Pts	PIM	GP	G	A	Pts	PIM
1999–00	HC Vitkovice U20	Czech U20	45	1	5	6	62	2	0	0	0	4
2000–01	Bili Tygri Liberec U20	Czech U20	33	3	6	9	85	—	—	—	—	—
2000–01	Bili Tygri Liberec	Czech2	—	—	—	—	—	1	0	0	0	0
2001–02	Bili Tygri Liberec U20	Czech U20	33	4	14	18	81	—	—	—	—	—
2001–02	Bili Tygri Liberec	Czech2	2	0	1	1	2	—	—	—	—	—
2001–02	HC Vlci Jablonec nad Nisou	Czech3	15	0	2	2	83	—	—	—	—	—
2002–03	Bili Tygri Liberec	Czech	4	0	0	0	4	—	—	—	—	—
2002–03	IHC Pisek	Czech2	38	0	8	8	53	5	1	2	3	6
2003–04	Bili Tygri Liberec	Czech	14	1	3	4	12	—	—	—	—	—
2000–01	HC Berounsti Medvedi	Czech2	32	1	4	5	52	11	1	1	2	43
2004–05	Bili Tygri Liberec	Czech	19	0	1	1	8	4	0	0	0	4
2004–05	BK Mladá Boleslav	Czech2	31	2	10	12	32	—	—	—	—	—
2004–05	HC Berounsti Medvedi	Czech2	5	1	1	2	6	—	—	—	—	—
2005–06	HC Znojemsti Orli	Czech	50	3	3	6	60	11	0	1	1	12
2006–07	HC Znojemsti Orli	Czech	51	0	3	3	82	10	0	1	1	22
2007–08	HC Znojemsti Orli	Czech	52	11	11	22	102	3	0	0	0	4
2008–09	HC Mountfield	Czech	27	0	1	1	32	—	—	—	—	—
2008–09	Bili Tygri Liberec	Czech	20	0	3	3	67	3	0	0	0	4
2009–10	Bili Tygri Liberec	Czech	52	3	8	11	46	12	0	2	2	10
2010–11	HC Benzina Litvínov	Czech	46	6	7	13	38	10	2	4	6	22
2011–12	HC Verva Litvínov	Czech	44	4	13	17	77	—	—	—	—	—
2012–13	HC Verva Litvínov	Czech	29	1	2	3	42	6	0	0	0	6
2013–14	Iserlohn Roosters	DEL	52	3	11	14	60	2	0	0	0	0
2014–15	Iserlohn Roosters	DEL	37	0	5	5	26	7	0	0	0	0
2015–16	Eispiraten Crimmitschau	DEL2	1	0	0	0	0	—	—	—	—	—
Czech totals			408	29	55	84	570	59	2	8	10	84
