= The Jar =

American horror film

- Directed by: Bruce Toscano
- Written by: George Bradley
- Starring: Gary Wallace
- Cinematography: Cameron MacLeod
- Edited by: Bruce Toscano
- Music by: Obscure Sighs
- Release date: April 16, 1984 (United States)
- Running time: 85 minutes
- Country: United States
- Language: English
- Budget: $200,000 (estimated)

The Jar is a 1984 American horror film directed by Bruce Toscano.

== Plot ==
A schoolteacher named Paul gets in an auto accident with an old man. After bringing the old man to his apartment to heal him, Paul finds that the man has disappeared, leaving behind a bottle in a paper bag. Within the bottle is a demon who possesses Paul and induces hallucinations including vignettes of being crucified and fighting as a soldier. Paul murders his neighbor and passes on his demonic possession to his boss.

== Cast ==
- Gary Wallace as Paul
- Karin Sjöberg as Crystal
- Dean Schoepter as Young Man
- Les Miller as Old Man
- Robert Gerald Witt as Jack
- Don Donovan as Jester
