= AJAR (applications software platform) =

AJAR is a Motorola applications software platform for mass-market feature phones, designed to help players across the mobile industry develop highly customised, fully featured handsets rapidly and cost-effectively.

== History ==
AJAR started its development life in 2002 and was a revolution of an earlier TTPCom applications framework that was used by many OEMs and ODMs in the industry during the late 1990s and early 2000s.

Prior to Motorola, TTPCom licensed AJAR to several key OEMs, ODMs, semi-conductor manufacturers and system integrators. Motorola was a strategic customer of TTPCom and consequently bought the company and the technology in 2006.

AJAR was used on only one Motorola phone: the Motorola W450 in 2008. Motorola discussed licensing AJAR to other OEMs, but the platform appears to have remained niche, with its best-known Motorola use being the W450 in 2008.

== Description ==
AJAR combines a complete applications framework, toolset and a suite of pre-integrated applications. It represents a single investment in applications for products used across multiple networks (2G, 2.5G, EDGE, CDMA, 3G and HSDPA), multiple architectures (single processor, coprocessor, application processor) and different handset designs (candy bar, clamshell).

AJAR is compatible with multiple cellular chipsets across a range of handsets from entry level to feature phone.
