= Ajar, Afghanistan =

Ajar آژار
- Location in Afghanistan
- Coordinates: 35°21′52″N 67°29′37″E
- Country: Afghanistan
- Province: Bamyan
- Time zone: + 4.30

Ajar (Persian: آژار) is a village in Bamyan Province in northern-central Afghanistan.

== See also ==
- Bamyan Province
