= Kalkeh Jar =

Kalkeh Jar كلكه جار
- Village
- Location within Iran
- Coordinates: 36°17′23″N 46°59′14″E
- Country: Iran
- Province: Kurdistan
- County: Divandarreh
- Bakhsh: Karaftu
- Rural District: Obatu

Population (2006)
  - Total: 223
- Time zone: UTC+3:30 (IRST)
  - Summer (DST): UTC+4:30 (IRDT)

Kalkeh Jar (Persian: كلكه جار, also Romanized as Kalkeh Jār and Kalkehjār; also known as Jār) is a village in Obatu Rural District, Karaftu District, Divandarreh County, Kurdistan Province, Iran. At the 2006 census, its population was 223, in 44 families. The village is populated by Kurds.
