= Motorola =

American telecommunications company (1928–2011)

Motorola, Inc.
- The Motorola logo used from 1955 to 2011. This logo is currently still used by Motorola Solutions.

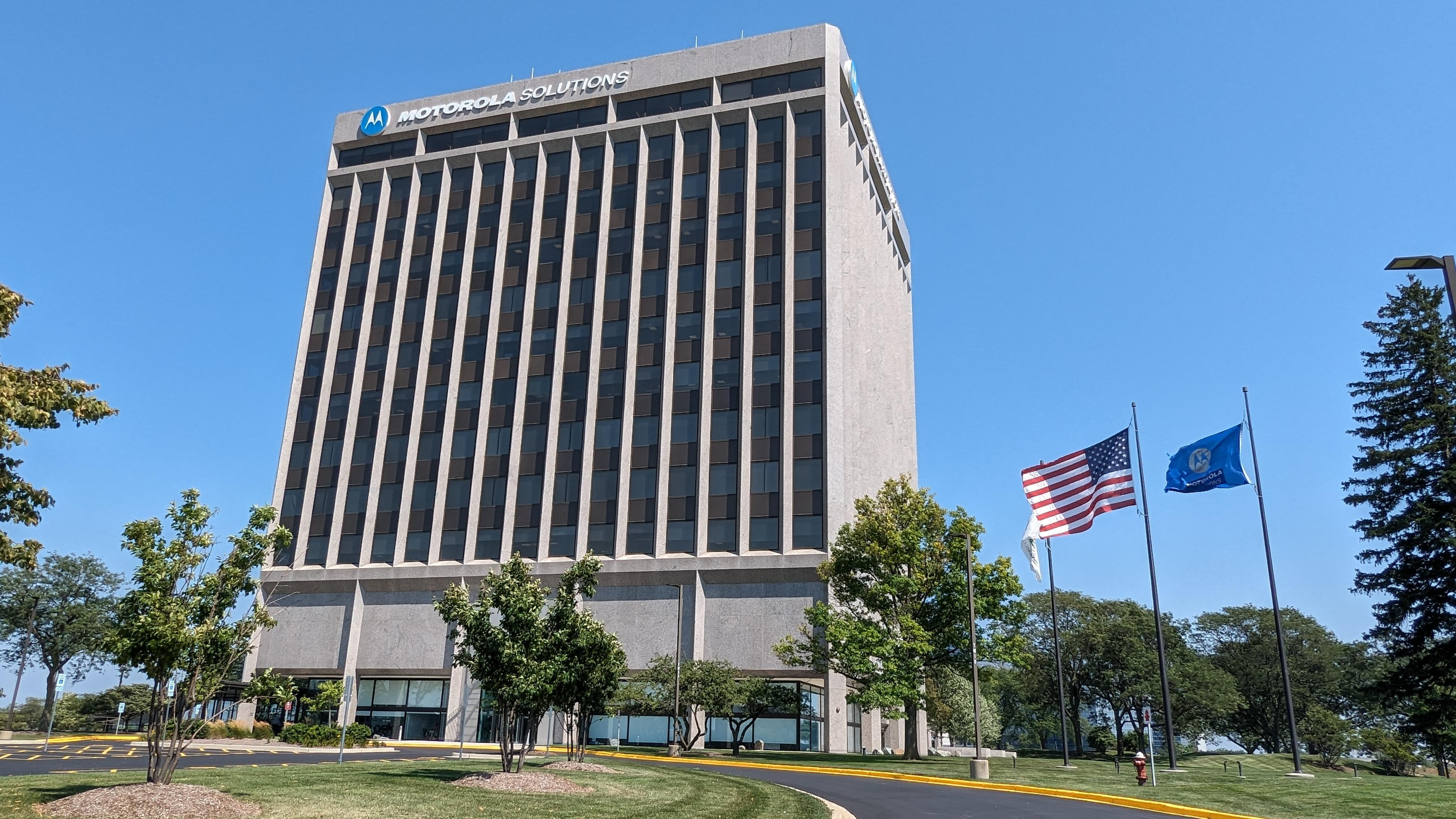
- Final headquarters in Schaumburg, Illinois, acquired by Motorola Solutions after the 2011 split
- Formerly: Galvin Manufacturing Corporation (1928–1947)
- Type: Public
- Traded as: NYSE: MOT
- Industry: Telecommunications
- Founded: September 25, 1928; 98 years ago in Chicago, Illinois, U.S.
- Founders: Paul Galvin; Joseph Galvin
- Defunct: January 4, 2011; 15 years ago
- Fate: Split into Motorola Solutions and Motorola Mobility
- Successors: Motorola Mobility (Lenovo, formerly Google); Motorola Solutions; Freescale Semiconductor; ON Semiconductor; Arris Group (General Instrument); Cambium Networks; NXP Semiconductors
- Headquarters: Schaumburg, Illinois, U.S.
- Area served: Worldwide
- Products: Tablet computers Cordless telephones Mobile phones Smartphones; Two-way radios Networking systems Cable television systems Wireless broadband networks RFID systems Mobile telephone infrastructure
- Number of employees: 53,000 (2010)
- Divisions: Mobile Devices; Home & Networks Mobility; Enterprise Mobility Solutions
- Website: www.motorola.com (archived December 31, 2010)

Motorola, Inc. (/ˌmoʊtəˈroʊlə/) was an American multinational telecommunications company based in Schaumburg, Illinois. It was founded by brothers Paul and Joseph Galvin in 1928 as Galvin Manufacturing Corporation and was renamed Motorola in 1947. Many of Motorola's products had been radio-related communication equipment such as two-way radios, consumer walkie-talkies, cellular infrastructure, mobile phones, satellite communicators, pagers, as well as cable modems and semiconductors. After having lost $4.3 billion from 2007 to 2009, Motorola was split into two independent public companies: Motorola Solutions (its legal successor) and Motorola Mobility (spun off), on January 4, 2011.

Motorola designed and sold wireless network equipment such as cellular transmission base stations and signal amplifiers. Its business and government customers consisted mainly of wireless voice and broadband systems (used to build private networks), and public safety communications systems like Astro and Dimetra. Motorola's home and broadcast network products included set-top boxes, digital video recorders, and network equipment used to enable video broadcasting, computer telephony, and high-definition television. These businesses, except for set-top boxes and cable modems, became part of Motorola Solutions after the split of Motorola in 2011.

Motorola's wireless telephone handset division was a pioneer in cellular telephones. Also known as the Personal Communication Sector (PCS) prior to 2004, it pioneered the first mobile phone with the Motorola DynaTAC in 1983, followed by the more compact MicroTAC and the clamshell StarTAC in the 1990s. It had staged a resurgence by the mid-2000s with the RAZR, but lost market share in the second half of that decade, as the company's one-hit wonders were not enough to reinstate Motorola as a leader. Later it focused on smartphones using Google's Android mobile operating system, the first released product being Motorola Droid in 2009. The handset division was later spun off into Motorola Mobility.

== History ==
Galvin Manufacturing Corporation was founded in Chicago, Illinois (at 847 West Harrison Street) in 1928 to make a battery eliminator.

Paul Galvin wanted a brand name for the company's new car radio, and created the name "Motorola" by linking "motor", (from "motor car"), with the "ola" suffix, (from "Victrola"), which also alludes to other brand names with similar suffix, e.g. Pianola, Moviola, and Crayola. The company sold its first Motorola branded radio on June 23, 1930, to Herbert C. Wall of Fort Wayne, Indiana, for $30. The Motorola brand name became so well known that Galvin Manufacturing Corporation later changed its name to Motorola, Inc., in 1947.

Galvin Manufacturing Corporation began selling Motorola car-radio receivers to police departments and municipalities in November 1930. The company's first public safety customers (all in the U.S. state of Illinois) included the Village of River Forest, Village of Bellwood Police Department, City of Evanston Police, Illinois State Highway Police, and Cook County (Chicago area) Police.

Many of Motorola's products have been radio-related, starting with a battery eliminator for battery powered radios (during the burgeoning electrification of rural homes), through the first handheld walkie-talkie in the world in 1940, defense electronics, cellular infrastructure equipment, and mobile phone manufacturing. In the same year, the company built its research and development program with Dan Noble, a pioneer in FM radio and semiconductor technologies, who joined the company as director of research. The company produced the hand-held AM SCR-536 radio during World War II, which was vital to Allied communication. Motorola ranked 94th among United States corporations in the value of World War II military production contracts.

Motorola went public in 1943, and became Motorola, Inc. in 1947. At that time Motorola's main business was producing and selling televisions and radios.

=== Post World War II ===
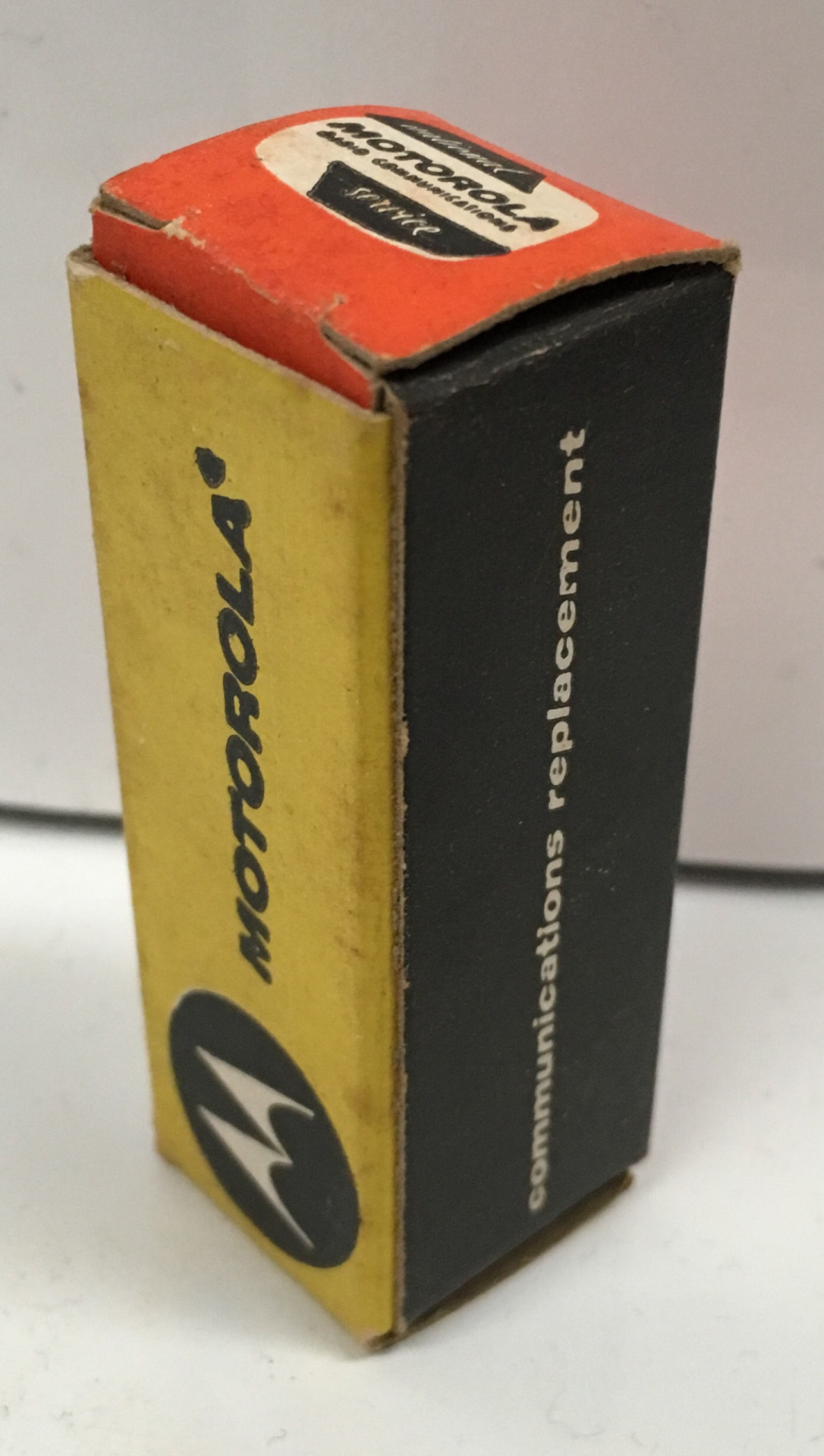
Motorola vacuum tube carton

The last plant was listed in Quincy, Illinois at 1400 North 30th Street where 1,200 employees made radio assemblies for homes and automobiles.

In 1969, Neil Armstrong spoke the famous words from the Moon on a Motorola transceiver: "That's one small step for [a] man, one giant leap for mankind".

In 1973, Motorola demonstrated the first hand-held portable telephone.

In 1974, Motorola introduced its first microprocessor, the 8-bit MC6800, used in automotive, computing, and video game applications. The 6800 is the basis for the more popular MOS Technology 6502 which was made by former Motorola employees. That year, Motorola sold its television business to the Japan-based Matsushita – the parent company of Panasonic.

In 1980, Motorola's next generation 32-bit microprocessor, the MC68000, led the wave of technologies that spurred the computing revolution in 1984, powering devices from companies such as Apple, Commodore, Atari, Sun, and Hewlett-Packard.

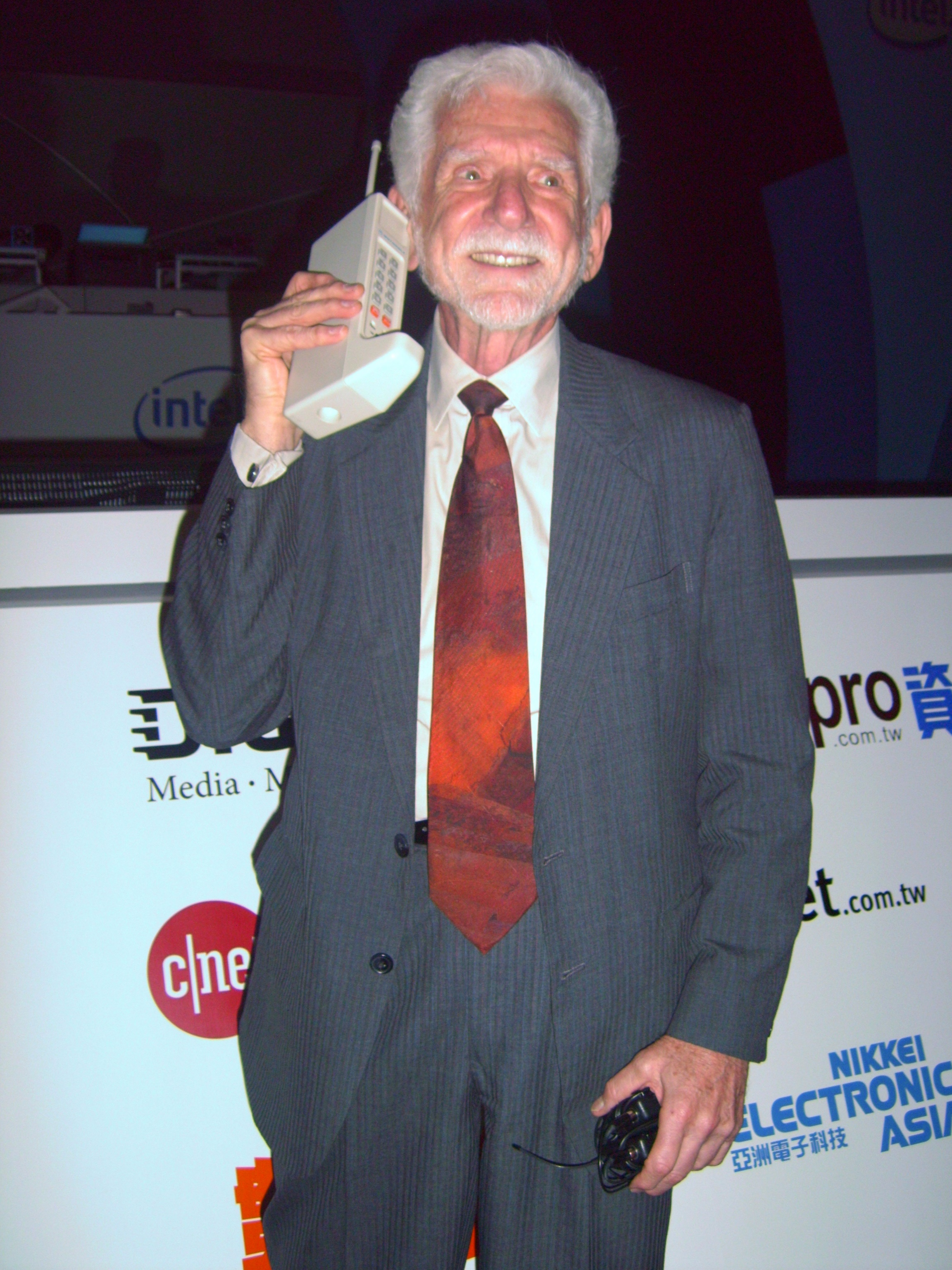
Dr. Martin Cooper of Motorola made the first private handheld mobile phone call on a larger prototype model in 1973. This is a reenactment in 2007.

In September 1983, the U.S. Federal Communications Commission (FCC) approved the DynaTAC 8000X telephone, the world's first commercial cellular device. By 1998, cell phones accounted for two thirds of Motorola's gross revenue.

In 1986, Motorola acquired Storno resulting in a new range of innovative communication products for the new owner, including the NMT, an automatic cellular phone system, and made Motorola a more central player in the early stages of the GSM standardization process in 1987. This addition significantly strengthened Motorola's position in Europe. As Motorola's European development arm, Storno developed a GSM terminal in 1992.

On January 29, 1988, Motorola sold its Arcade, New York, facility and automotive alternators, electromechanical speedometers, and tachometers products to Prestolite Electric.

In 1993, Motorola acquired Indala, entering the access control industry like badge and badge readers. The Assa Abloy subsidiary HID Global acquired Indala from Motorola in late 2001.

In April 1994, Motorola announced that it would build a $90 million, 1,500,000-square-foot cellular phone manufacturing plant at 2001 North Division Street in Harvard, Illinois, promising 3,000–5,000 jobs to the area on a 400-acre site. The plant was opened in November 1996 was employing approximately 5,000 people. After it laid off 2,500 employees and halting manufacturing in early 2001, the facility was closed in April 2003 due to shifts to digital technology and lower-cost manufacturing sites.

In 1996, Motorola released the StarMax, a Macintosh clone with System 7. However, with the return of Steve Jobs to Apple in 1997, Apple released Mac OS 8. Because all clone manufacturer' licenses were valid only for System 7, they became unable to ship a current OS without renegotiation. A heated telephone conversation between Jobs and then Motorola CEO Christopher Galvin resulted in the termination of Motorola's clone contract, the discontinuation of the StarMax, and the long-favored Apple being demoted to "just another customer" mainly for PowerPC CPUs. Apple did not want Motorola to limit the PowerPC CPU supply so as retaliation, Apple and IBM expelled Motorola from the AIM alliance and forced Motorola to stop producing any PowerPC CPUs, leaving IBM to make all future PowerPC CPUs. However, Motorola was later reinstated into the alliance in 1998.

In 1997, Motorola announced a $140 million expansion of its two-way radio manufacturing plant in Plantation, Florida, with potential for 1,000 new jobs by 2004. In August 1999, Motorola announced a major $50 million expansion of its manufacturing plant in Dublin, Ireland to produce new GSM cellular phones. Production of Irish-produced cellular phones begin in September of the year, adding 500 jobs to the facility.

Neglect of the emerging digital cellular standards ended Motorola's dominance in mobile phone handsets in the second half of the 1990s. In 1996 it fell behind Ericsson in the growing market for digital phones in the U.S. In 1998, Motorola was overtaken by Nokia as the world's biggest seller of mobile phone handsets. The company was also struggling in microchips (which together with cell phones accounted for the majority of Motorola's revenue), cellular infrastructure equipment, and the Iridium satellite project that it had invested in. Motorola sold some businesses, including in 1999 a portion of its semiconductor business called the Semiconductor Components Group (SCG) and formed onsemi (then ON Semiconductor) in Phoenix, Arizona.

=== After 2000 ===
By 2000, Motorola had shown signs of recovery from a long sustained period of decline. It was still, however, losing money on every handset sold, whereas Nokia was making large profits on each instead.

In June 2000, Motorola and Cisco supplied the world's first commercial GPRS cellular network to BT Cellnet in the United Kingdom. Motorola also developed the world's first GPRS cell phone.

In August 2000, Motorola acquired Printrak International Inc. for $160 million. In doing so, Motorola not only acquired computer aided dispatch and related software, but also acquired Automated fingerprint identification system software. With recent acquisitions from that year, Motorola reached its peak employment of 150,000 employees worldwide. Two years later, employment would be at 93,000 due to layoffs and spinoffs.

On December 6, 2000, as part of a $1 billion outsourcing agreement, Motorola announced it would sell two manufacturing plants located in Dublin, Ireland and Mt. Pleasant, Iowa to Celestica for $70 million. Also, Motorola announced it will cease pager manufacturing and lay off 800 employees at the Boynton Beach, Florida plant.

In February 2002, Motorola announced that it will cease manufacturing at the Plantation, Florida plant, shifting its two-way radio production to lower-cost countries. The 615,000-square-foot facility on an 80-acre site, which was opened in 1971, previously laid off 350 workers in May 2001. In September 2002, the company sold its 556,000-square-foot manufacturing plant in Boynton Beach, Florida on a 90-acre site, to a group of Florida-based investors for approximately US$22 million.

The company's handset division began using the "Hello Moto" tagline in advertising in 2002 which later also became a signature ringtone. In June 2005, Motorola overtook the intellectual property of Sendo for $30,000 and paid £362,575 for the plant, machinery and equipment.

In June 2006, Motorola acquired the software platform (AJAR) developed by the British company TTP Communications plc. Later in 2006, the firm announced a music subscription service named iRadio. The technology came after a break in a partnership with Apple Computer (which in 2005 had produced an iTunes compatible cell phone ROKR E1, and most recently, mid-2007, its own iPhone). iRadio was to have many similarities with existing satellite radio services (such as Sirius and XM Radio) by offering live streams of commercial-free music content. Unlike satellite services, however, iRadio content would be downloaded via a broadband internet connection. However, iRadio was never commercially released.

Greg Brown became Motorola's chief executive officer in 2008. In October 2008, Motorola agreed to sell its Biometrics business to Safran, a French defense firm. Motorola's biometric business unit was headquartered in Anaheim, California. The deal closed in April 2009. The unit became part of Sagem Morpho, which was renamed MorphoTrak.

=== Split of Motorola ===
On March 26, 2008, Motorola's board of directors approved a split into two different publicly traded companies. This came after talk of selling the company to another corporation. These new companies would comprise the business units of Motorola Mobile Devices and Motorola Broadband & Mobility Solutions. Originally it was expected that this action would be approved by regulatory bodies and complete by mid-2009, but the split was delayed due to company restructuring problems and the 2008–2009 extreme economic downturn.

On February 11, 2010, Motorola announced it would separate into two independent, publicly traded companies. The cell phone and cable television equipment businesses would spin off to form Motorola Mobility, while the remainder of Motorola, Inc., which comprised the government and enterprise equipment businesses, would become Motorola Solutions. The split was closed on January 4, 2011. Motorola Mobility was eventually acquired by Google on May 22, 2012. Google later sold Motorola Mobility's cable equipment business to Arris Group in December 2012, and Motorola Mobility itself to Lenovo on October 30, 2014.

== Divisions ==
At the time of its split, Motorola had three divisions:

- Enterprise Mobility Solutions was headquartered in Schaumburg, Illinois. It comprised communications offered to government and public safety sectors and enterprise mobility business, such as Motorola's investment in Evolv. Motorola developed analog and digital two-way radio, voice and data communications products and systems, mobile computing, advanced data capture, wireless infrastructure and RFID solutions to customers worldwide. This is the primary division that is subsumed by Motorola Solutions.
- Home & Networks Mobility produced end-to-end systems that facilitate uninterrupted access to digital entertainment, information and communications services via wired and wireless mediums. Motorola developed digital video system solutions, interactive set-top devices, voice and data modems for digital subscriber line and cable networks, broadband access systems for cable and satellite television operators, and also wireline carriers and wireless service providers. It was based in Arlington Heights, Illinois. This division was subsumed briefly by Motorola Mobility, and later sold to Arris Group.
- Mobile Devices' headquarters were located in Chicago, Illinois, and designed wireless handsets, but also licensed much of its intellectual properties. This included cellular and wireless systems and as well as integrated applications and Bluetooth accessories. This division was spun off into Motorola Mobility.

== Corporate affairs ==
=== Finances ===
Motorola's handset division recorded a loss of $1.2 billion in the fourth quarter of 2007, while the company as a whole earned $100 million during that quarter. It lost several key executives to rivals, and the website TrustedReviews called the company's products repetitive and un-innovative. Motorola laid off 3,500 workers in January 2008, followed by a further 4,000 job cuts in June and another 20% cut of its research division a few days later. In July 2008, a large number of executives left Motorola to work on Apple's iPhone. The company's handset division was also put on offer for sale. Also that month, analyst Mark McKechnie from American Technology Research said that Motorola "would be lucky to fetch $500 million" for selling its handset business. Analyst Richard Windsor said that Motorola might have to pay someone to take the division off the company's hands, and that Motorola may even exit the handset market altogether. Its global market share has been on the decline; from 18.4% of the market in 2007 the company had a share of just 6.0% by Q1 2009, but at last, Motorola scored a profit of $26 million in Q2 and showed an increase of 12% in stocks for the first time after losses in many quarters. During the second quarter of 2010, the company reported a profit of $162 million, which compared very favorably to the $26 million earned for the same period the year before. Its Mobile Devices division reported, for the first time in years, earnings of $87 million.

== Environmental record ==
Motorola, Inc., along with the Arizona Water Co. had been identified as the sources of trichloroethylene (TCE) contamination that took place in Scottsdale, Arizona. The malfunction led to a ban on the use of water that lasted three days and affected almost 5000 people in the area. Motorola was found to be the main source of the TCE, an industrial solvent that causes cancer. The TCE contamination was caused by a faulty blower on an air stripping tower that was used to take TCE from the water, and Motorola has attributed the situation to operator error.

Of eighteen leading electronics manufacturers in Greenpeace's Guide to Greener Electronics (October 2010), Motorola shared sixth place with competitors Panasonic and Sony.

Motorola scored relatively well on the chemicals criteria and has a goal to eliminate PVC plastic and Brominated flame retardants (BFRs), though only in mobile devices and not in all its products introduced after 2010, despite the fact that Sony Ericsson and Nokia were already there. All of its mobile phones were now PVC-free and it had two PVC and BFR-free mobile phones, the A45 ECO and the GRASP; all chargers were also free from PVC and BFRs.

The company was also increasing the proportion of recycled materials used in its products. For example, the housings for the MOTO W233 Renew and MOTOCUBO A45 Eco mobile phones contained plastic from post-consumer recycled water cooler bottles. According to the company's information, all of Motorola's newly designed chargers met the current Energy Star requirements and exceed the requirements for standby/no-load modes by at least 67%.

== Logo design ==
The Motorola logo consisting of a stylized letter M was designed by Chicago-based studio Morton Goldsholl Associates in 1955. Popularly known as the 'batwing' logo in reference to the wings of a bat, it represents two wave forms: namely the sine wave in the curves and the triangle wave in the peaks.

== See also ==
- List of Motorola products
- List of companies of the United States
- List of electronics companies
