= Swan Electronics =

American radio gear manufacturer

- Industry: Telecommunications
- Founded: 1960
- Headquarters: Oceanside, California, U.S.
- Key people: Herb Johnson, founder
- Products: Radio equipment

Swan Electronics was a manufacturer of amateur radio gear located in Oceanside, California, United States.

== History ==
Herbert G. Johnson, W6QKI, founded Swan Engineering. Johnson built the first ten largely vacuum tube type design single sideband (SSB) transceivers in a garage in Benson, Arizona, in 1960-1961. The more expensive Collins KWM-2 was the only other competing transceiver at the time. The operation moved to Oceanside, California, where, at one point, more than 400 radios per month were being manufactured, and some estimates say that more than 80,000 transceivers were sold during the company's lifetime.

Swan merged with Cubic Corporation in 1967, and Johnson managed Swan as its subsidiary until 1973. Johnson founded Atlas Radio in 1974. Atlas produced smaller solid state radios for mobile communications from vehicles of all types.

Many Swan radios remain in service today, restored and operated by vintage amateur radio enthusiasts.

== Amateur radio products ==
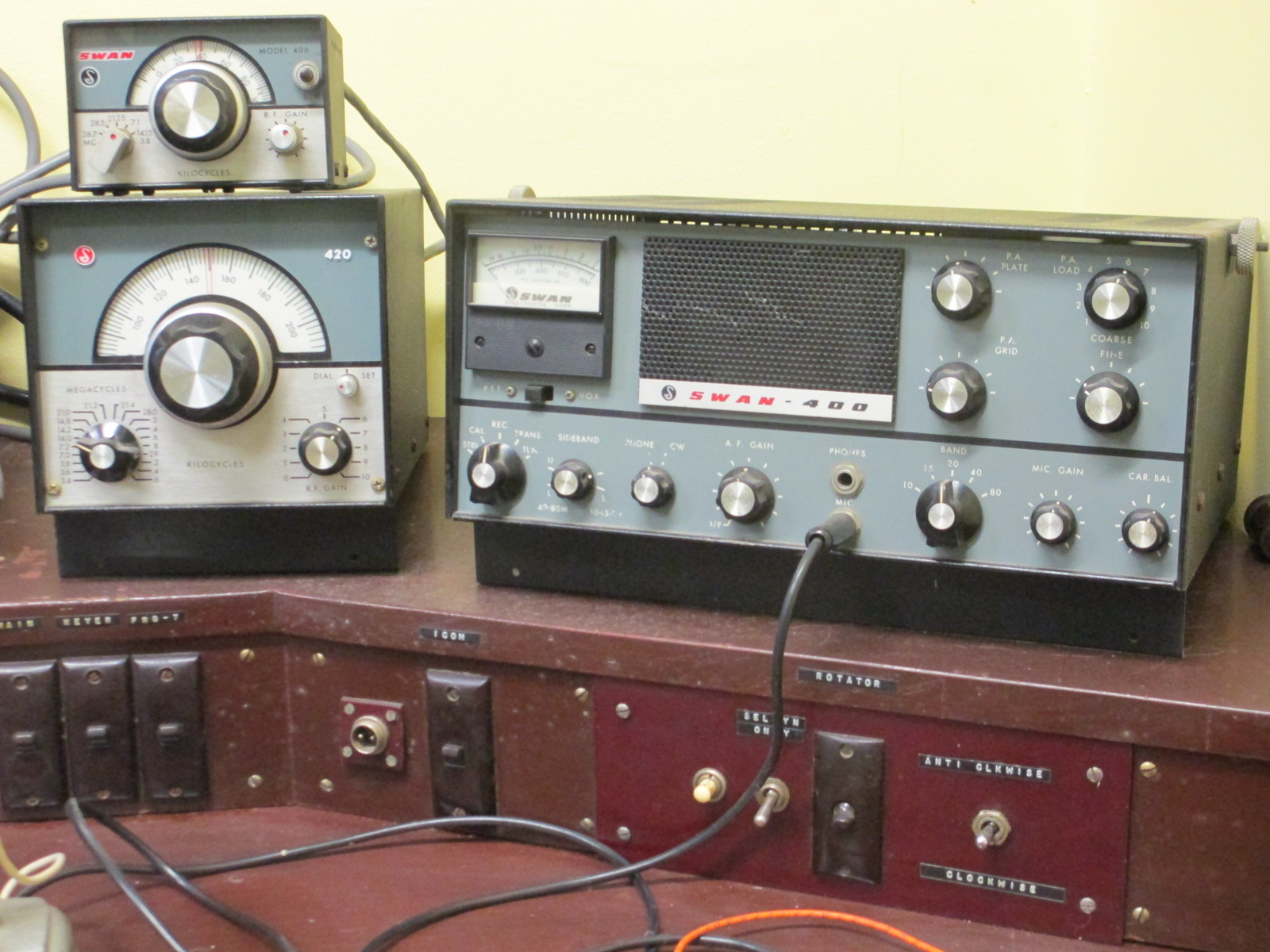
Swan 400 transceiver

Swan’s entry into the amateur radio equipment market consisted of transceivers primarily designed for the newly popular single sideband (SSB) mode of voice transmission, and covered only those portions of the amateur radio bands where SSB could be used.

The first ten transceivers Swan produced were serial numbered from 101-1 to 110-1, with the first nine being model SW-120 operating on 20 meters (14 MHz), and the tenth, 110-1, being the first SW-140, operating on 40 meters (7 MHz). The SW-175 then covered the 75 meter band (3.8 MHz).

Following the single band transceivers, Swan introduced the model 240, which covered all three bands in one unit, and then the model 400, which covered five bands (adding 21 and 28 MHz) and had a VFO in a separate unit.

Later, in the mid-1960s, Swan introduced the more full-featured models 350 and 500 transceivers. The Swan 500 was a more costly version of the 350, with higher output power and more operating features. Although they lacked the higher selectivity and tuning accuracy of higher priced transceivers, each performed solidly as a basic SSB station. They both used an outboard AC power supply with a built-in speaker, the model 117C and its variants. Improved versions of the 350 and 500 continued to be released into the early 1970s and were Swan’s best selling models.

One of the distinguishing design features of that generation of Swan transceivers was their dual rate, gear-driven tuning dial. A front knob provided slow rate tuning while a metal, outer collar tuned much faster enabling rapid frequency changes across a band. Improved models of the two transceivers were periodically introduced well into the 1970s along with accessories, including a remote VFO (for separate control of receiver and transmitter frequency) and the Mark-I and Mark-II linear amplifiers.

Magazine ad circa 1970s featuring Swan 600T/600R

Two additional single band transceivers were also made to operate on bands not included in the 350 and 500 but with similar styling and features. A 6-meter (50 MHz) transceiver, the Swan 250, was introduced in 1965, and the Swan 160X was built to cover (not surprisingly) the 160 meter (1.8 MHz) band. They were high and low frequency bookends to the mainstay, five-band 350 and 500.

In 1969 Swan brought out the slightly smaller model 260 transceiver which could be operated from either 110 V AC or 12 V DC permitting either fixed or mobile operation in one unit. Also named the “Cygnet”, it resembled the earlier Swan 240 but with a different color scheme. It was followed by an improved model 270 and 270B, which could only operate from AC power and required an accessory power supply for DC operation.

In the 1970s, the Swan 500 was upgraded again and became the model 700 and 750, and underwent a styling change in later versions after the merge with Cubic.

Swan also designed a matched, separate receiver and transmitter pair, the 600R and 600T, which together offered better performance, higher output power and many more features than the transceivers could. They were produced in far fewer numbers, however, and are therefore harder for collectors to find today.

== See also ==
- Collins radio
- E.F. Johnson
- Eico
- Hallicrafters
- Hammarlund
- National radio
- R. L. Drake Company
- Signal/One
- Vintage amateur radio
