= Clayton Jones =

Clayton Jones may refer to:

- Clayton Jones (judge), American judge
- Clayton M. Jones (born 1952), American business chairman
- Clay Jones (cartoonist) (born 1966), American editorial cartoonist

== See also ==
- Louis Clayton Jones (born 1935-2006), American attorney and civil rights leader
- Clay Jones (disambiguation)
