= R. L. Drake Company =

American electronics manufacturer

R.L. Drake, LLC.
- Industry: Telecommunications Systems
- Founded: 1943
- Headquarters: Springboro, Ohio, USA
- Products: Digital Cable TV Equipment
- Owner: Blonder Tongue Laboratories, Inc.
- Website: www.rldrake.com

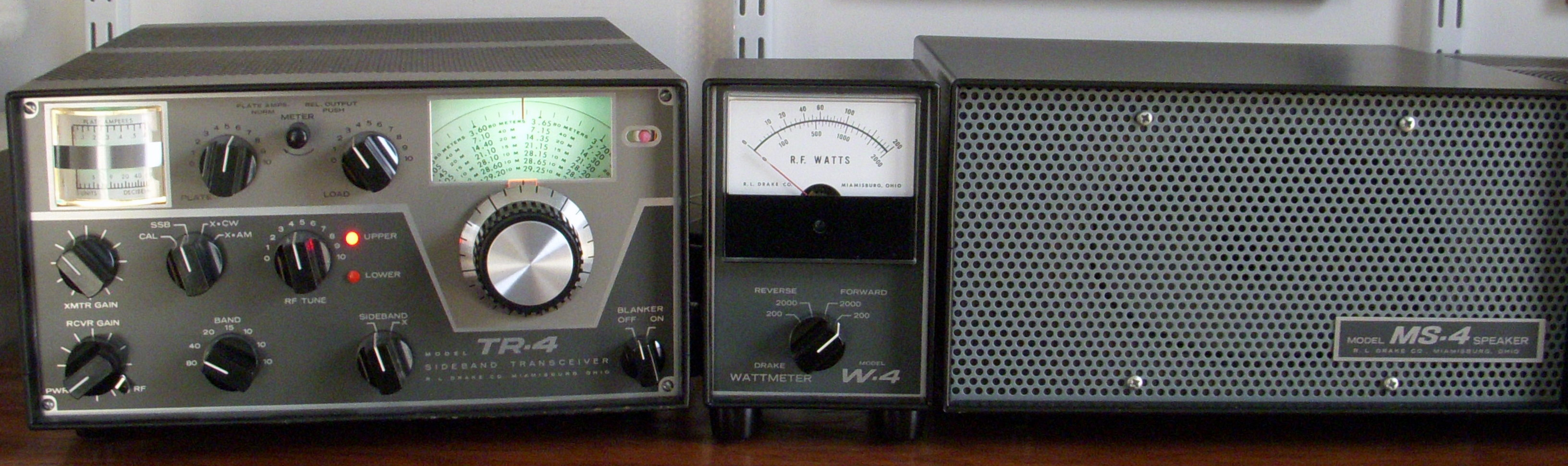
Drake TR-4, W-4, MS-4 circa 1971

The R. L. Drake Company is a manufacturer of electronic communications equipment located in Springboro, Ohio. It is also known for its line of equipment for amateur radio and shortwave listening, built in the 1950s through the 1980s. The company operates as a separate entity owned by Blonder Tongue Laboratories, Inc.

== History ==
The company was founded in 1943 by radio design engineer Robert L. Drake. The company began as a manufacturer of low-pass and high-pass filters for the government and amateur radio market, and after World War II, produced amateur radio transmitters and receivers and communications receivers for maritime mobile service.

Amateur stations made up of Drake gear were used on a number of record-breaking hot air balloon flights, the RMS Queen Mary, and the Rutan Voyager. Many of the Drake receivers, transmitters, and transceivers manufactured in the 1950s, 1960s, and 1970s are still in active use today. When founder Robert L. Drake died in 1975, the operation and management of the company was turned over to his 2nd son, Peter W. Drake.

Today, Drake produces products for cable television systems, SD and HD video encoders, video signal distribution, and digital television reception under the Drake and Dracom brand.

In February 2012, Blonder Tongue Laboratories, Inc. acquired R.L. Drake, LLC, reportedly for a purchase price of approximately $6.5 million, however, the companies will operate as separate entities; Blonder Tongue in Old Bridge, New Jersey, and R.L. Drake in Miamisburg, Ohio.

== Amateur radio products ==
Drake manufactured equipment for amateur radio operators and short wave listeners for more than three decades.

=== Longwave, mediumwave, and high frequency (HF) equipment ===
The Drake 1A receiver was the company's first meant specifically for radio amateurs. Introduced in 1957, it was revolutionary in at least two ways. First, it was much smaller than most receivers of the time period. The design emphasized simplicity and ease of operation. Second, it was designed specifically for reception of the relatively new and increasingly popular single sideband (SSB) mode of voice transmission.

In 1959 they followed the 1A with the 2A, a more traditional looking receiver that was a bit larger but still much more compact than its contemporaries. The 2A had more features, increased sensitivity and selectivity, and was introduced at the same price as the 1A. It was followed two years later by the 2B, very similar in appearance but with improved performance and a new set of controls for adjusting the selectivity (bandwidth) and center frequency.

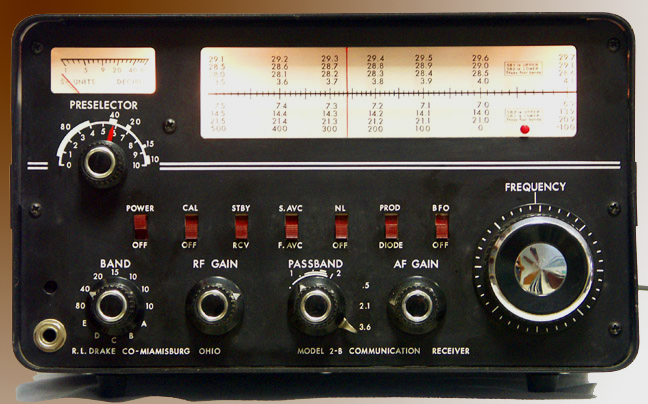
Drake 2B radio receiver circa 1960s

Rather than produce a transmitter to match the 2B, Drake designed a new line of equipment beginning with an SSB transceiver, the TR-3, in 1963. Again emphasizing size efficiency, the TR-3 was designed as a complete SSB station in a small package. Other design innovations included crystal bandwidth filters and a permeability tuned oscillator (PTO) capable of extremely linear, stable tuning and a dial resolution of better than 1 kHz across all amateur HF (shortwave) bands. Its size was so small, in part, because the power supply was in a separate chassis, connected to the transceiver with a multi-conductor cable. The AC-3 power supply could be installed inside a matching speaker cabinet, later designated the MS-4. An optional remote VFO (PTO), the RV-3 could be added to the system to enable split frequency operation (i.e., transmitting on a frequency different from the receiving frequency). The RV-3 (and, later, the RV-4) also contained a speaker.

Beginning with the TR-3, Drake adopted a scheme for illuminating tuning dials and panel meters on its equipment using small incandescent bulbs behind greenish-blue transparent plastic filters. This lighting color became one of the most recognizable and distinguishing features of Drake radios.

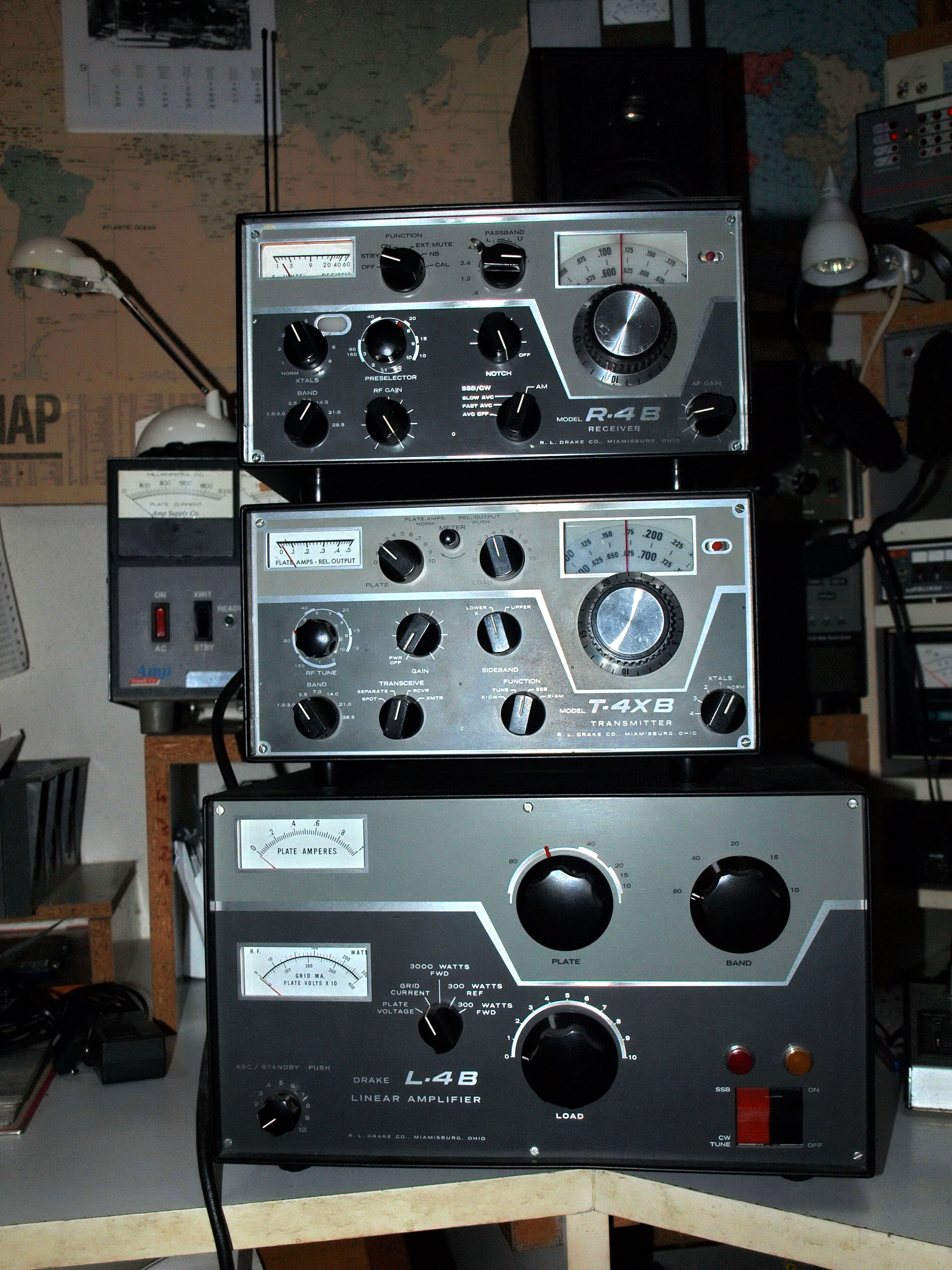
Drake R-4B receiver, T-4XB transmitter, and L-4B linear amplifier

The TR-3 was superseded by several versions of the TR-4, ending with the TR-4C and its variants in 1978. The TR-6, covering the 50 MHz (6-meter) amateur band, was also introduced in 1968 and was produced for about six years.

Because of their small size, the Drake transceivers were widely used for mobile operation, along with the DC-3 or DC-4 power supplies.

In 1965, Drake introduced the matching T-4X transmitter and R-4 receiver. The "4-Line" twins satisfied a desire for high performance, operational flexibility and a set of features not possible to squeeze into the TR-4's small size. The matching units used the same PTO technology as the TR-4, and were capable of transceive operation using either the receiver's or the transmitter's PTO to control the operating frequency. Drake introduced the T-4 "reciter" which was a transmitter add on for the R4 series receivers (it had no PTO of its own and used the PTO and other signals from the R4 receiver to generate the transmit signal), making them a two-piece "transceiver", but it saw limited sales and is a rare item on the used ham gear lists these days.

The 4-Line continued to be improved through ‘A’ and ‘B’ versions, and underwent a significant receiver redesign when the “C-Line” came out in 1973. The T-4XC transmitter and R-4C receiver employed a few more solid state devices but were still primarily vacuum tube designs.

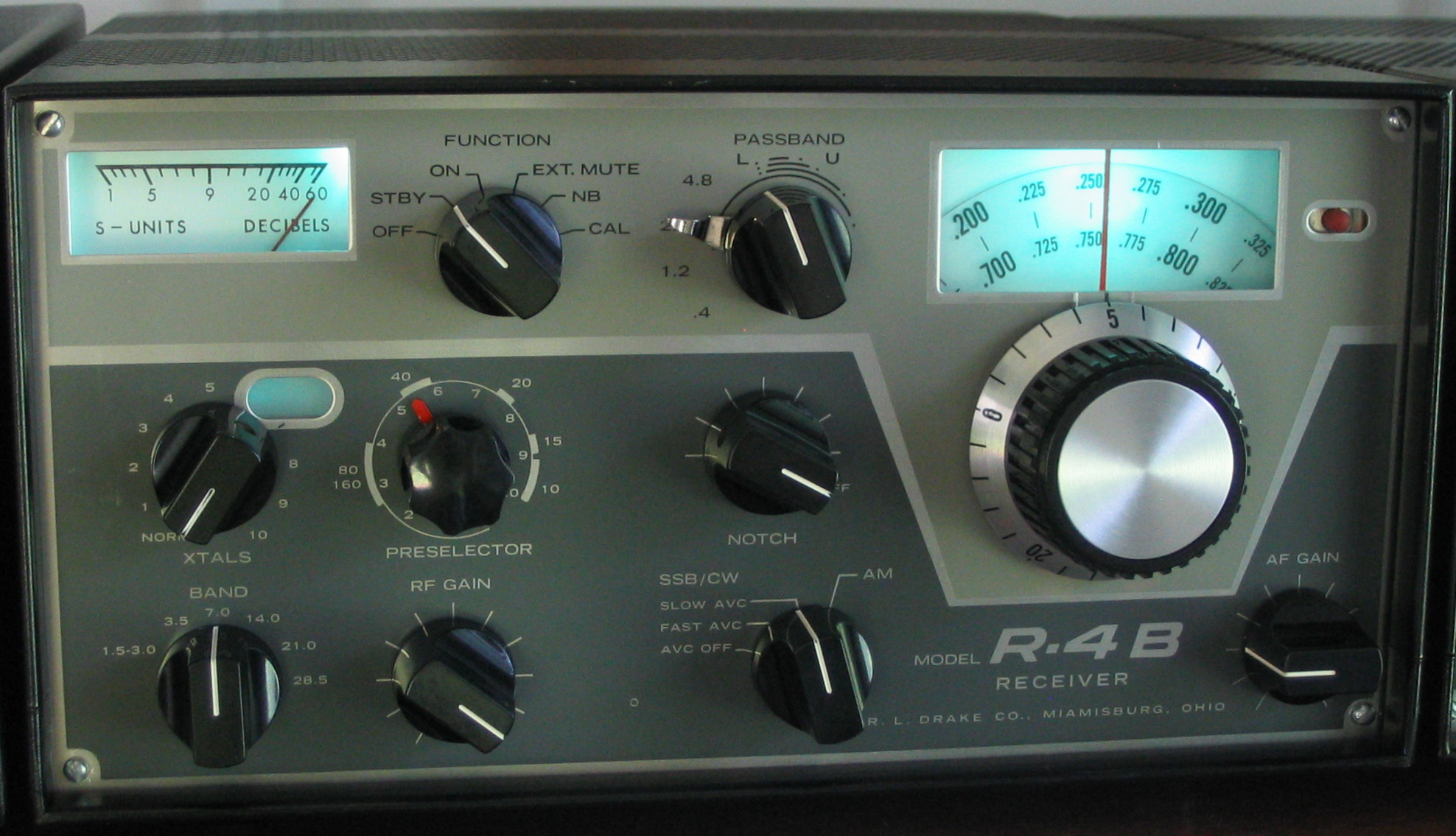
Drake R-4B receiver circa 1971

Along with transceivers and separates, the 4-Line included a set of matching accessories including the L-4 linear amplifier, C-4 control console, W-4 and WV-4 power meters, transmit and receive converters for the 50 MHz (6 meter) and 144 MHz (2 meter) bands, and antenna impedance matching networks (tuners), the MN-4 and MN-2000.

Midway through the 4-Line's run, in 1967, Drake introduced a receiver and transmitter pair meant for the Novice licensee - the 2-C receiver and 2-NT transmitter. The 2-C was an improved receiver based on the 2-B design using a few more solid state devices. Thus, it was a sophisticated design compared to most other receivers targeting Novices. The 2-NT used a crystal oscillator to control its frequency, a requirement of the Novice license at that time (the restriction was later removed by the Federal Communications Commission (FCC)).

For short wave listeners, Drake produced the SW-4 receiver in 1967 (and later the SW-4A), which matched the rest of the 4-Line in appearance, was based on the R-4 design, but greatly simplified to be easier for the casual listener to use. It was replaced in 1973 by the SPR-4, a receiver similar in appearance to the R-4C but, again, simplified for ease of use. Its biggest difference, however, was that it was Drake's first all solid state design. It covered a greater portion of the high frequency (HF) and medium wave spectrum than did the SW-4, by using a large set of selectable heterodyne oscillator crystals for selecting the tuning range, each covering a 500 kHz wide segment. The receiver came supplied with 10 crystals and a user could add up to 14 more.

In 1978 Drake abandoned vacuum tubes (except for their use in power amplifiers) in favor of solid state designs and digital frequency synthesis. The new “7-Line” included the TR-7 transceiver, the R-7 receiver, and various accessories including two linear amplifiers, the L-7 and L-75.

The TR-5, largely a solid state version of the TR-4, was built and briefly sold during the early 1980s. Because so few of them were made they have become comparatively scarce.

Drake's final entry into the Amateur radio and Shortwave listening markets was the R-8 receiver in 1991 – a high performance digital design with advanced features specifically meant for shortwave broadcast listening. The receiver, which primarily covered medium and short wave bands, could be expanded to cover two VHF ranges with an optional, internal adapter. Further improvements led to R-8A and R-8B models before it was discontinued in 2005 after a long production run.

=== Very high frequency (VHF) and ultra high frequency (UHF) equipment ===
In addition to the converters designed as part of Drake's 4-Line, they began designing and selling compact VHF and UHF transceivers in the early 1970s. Powered by 12V DC, they were primarily intended for mobile use.

Drake marketed a series of VHF transceivers manufactured in Japan, under the Drake brand. The ML-2 “Marker Luxury” was a crystal controlled FM transceiver for the 2-meter (144 MHz) band.

The TR-22, TR-22C, and TR-33 were very small 2-meter FM transceivers that were entirely self-contained, including a telescoping antenna and rechargeable battery. They each came with a microphone and carrying case with shoulder strap. These transceivers were manufactured by Trio-Kenwood in Japan and marketed worldwide as TR-2200 and TR-2300 under their manufacturer's own brands.

Drake's UV-3 FM transceiver, manufactured in the US, covered the 144, 220, and 440 MHz bands. A different model was available for covering one, two, or three bands. A user could start with one or two and add more later by purchasing modular add-on RF modules factory installed. It was their first VHF/UHF transceiver on 220 MHz to use frequency synthesis instead of crystals for establishing the operating frequency. It also employed direct FM instead of the standard phase modulation thus having better audio. It was a model ahead of its time and the later compact multiband Kenwood TM-x41/x42 series that was sold in the late 1980s to mid 1990s, which could handle three band modules; the modules produced covered the 10,6,2,220,440 and 1200 MHz FM amateur bands).

The TR-72 was a crystal controlled 2-meter FM transceiver that bore a striking resemblance to TR-7200 transceivers from Trio-Kenwood (now Kenwood Corporation), indicating its manufacturing origin.

== See also ==
- Collins radio
- E.F. Johnson
- Eico
- Hallicrafters
- Hammarlund
- Heathkit
- National radio
- Swan electronics
- Vintage amateur radio
