= Etymology of ham radio =

Informal term for amateur radio operators

Ham radio is a popular term for amateur radio, derived from "ham" as an informal name for an amateur radio operator. The use first appeared in the United States during the opening decade of the 20th century—for example, in 1909, Robert A. Morton reported overhearing an amateur radio transmission which included the comment: "Say, do you know the fellow who is putting up a new station out your way? I think he is a ham." However, the term did not gain widespread usage in the United States until around 1920, after which it slowly spread to other English-speaking countries.

== Etymology ==
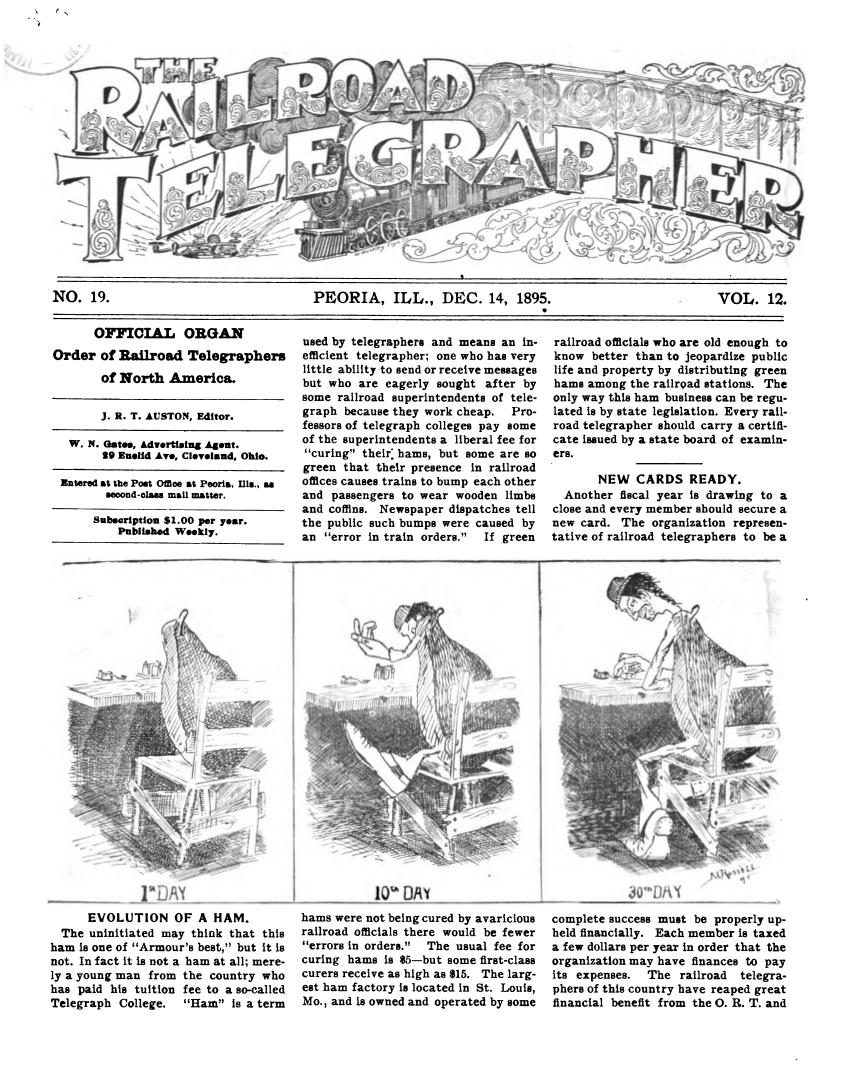
Satirical cartoon of a "Ham" telegraph operator, 1895

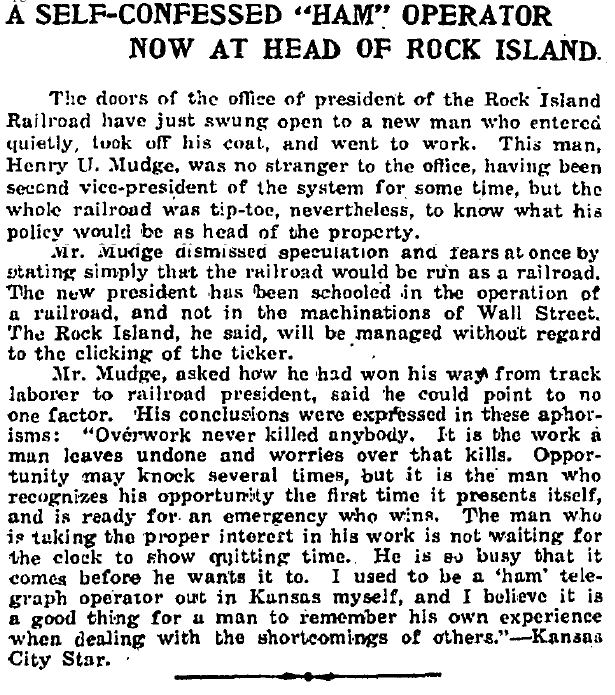
A newspaper article about a self-described "ham" telegraph operator, 1909

At the turn of the 20th century, the terms "ham" and "plug" were used by landline telegraphers to describe an operator "who lacks ability" or who had poor or "ham fisted" skills. By 1881, it had been alleged by telegrapher unions and trade groups that companies were employing "ham" operators who were negligent or incompetent. These unskilled operators were described as either drinking alcohol while working, irresponsible teenage boys, or merely having very little ability. Their miscommunication was blamed for causing severe train wrecks. Railroad executives during this era were also accused of hiring unskilled operators to save money and were said to be accepting bribes from telegraph schools to hire unqualified students. These disreputable telegraph schools were referred to as "ham factories".

Early radio (initially known as wireless telegraphy) included many former wire telegraph operators, and within the new service "ham" was employed as a pejorative term by professional radiotelegraph operators to suggest that amateur enthusiasts were unskilled. In "Floods and Wireless" by Hanby Carver, from the August 1915 Technical World Magazine, the author noted "Then someone thought of the 'hams'. This is the name that the commercial wireless service has given to amateur operators..."

This pejorative usage continued into at least 1940, as evidenced in the January 1940 issue of The APCO Bulletin, where it was written "Rumors of citations by the FCC for violation of the superfluous traffic regulation on the part of certain of our radiotelegraph stations have resulted in a sudden decrease in 'hamming' on the police frequencies...".

Even among amateur radio operators, the term was used pejoratively at first by serious experimenters. For example, in December 1916 QST magazine, an amateur operator working on long distance message passing describes one way to avoid interference was to send messages "...on Thursday nights, when the children and spark coil 'hams' are tucked up in bed" (a spark coil was an unsophisticated radio transmitter, made from an automobile ignition coil, that produced noisy interference).

But only a few months later, in an indication of the changing use of the term among amateurs, a QST writer used it in a clearly complimentary manner, saying that a particular 16-year-old amateur operator "...is the equal of a ham gaining five years of experience by hard luck."

Use of "ham" as a slur by professionals continued, however. A letter from a Western Union Telegraph Company employee, printed in the December 1919 issue of QST, showed familiarity with the word's negative connotations, expressing concern that "Many unknowing land wire telegraphers, hearing the word 'amateur' applied to men connected with wireless, regard him as a 'ham' or 'lid'".

But many other amateurs increasingly adopted the word "ham" to describe their hobby and themselves during this period, embracing a word that was originally an insult, similar to the way Yankee Doodle evolved, as seen, for example, in Thomas F. Hunter's exuberant "I am the wandering Ham" from the January 1920 issue of QST.

Within Australia, the term "HAM" is sometimes used as a backronym for the words Hobby Amateur.

== False etymologies ==
A number of folk etymologies about the supposed origin of "ham" radio evolved over the years since the origination of amateur wireless telegraphy.

=== "A little station called HAM" ===
This widely circulated but fanciful tale claims that, around 1911, an impassioned speech made by Harvard University student Albert Hyman to the United States Congress, in support of amateur radio operators, turned the tide and helped defeat a bill that would have ended amateur radio activity entirely by assigning the entire radio spectrum to the military. An amateur station that Hyman supposedly shared with Bob Almy and Reggie Murray, which was said to be using the self-assigned call sign HAM (short for Hyman-Almy-Murray), thus came to represent all of amateur radio. However, this story seems to have first surfaced in 1948, and practically none of the facts in the account check out, including the existence of "a little station called HAM" at Harvard in the first place.

In 1972, Ham Radio magazine editor Jim Fisk reported that Albert Hyman confirmed to him that Hyman, Robert Almy and Reginald Murray had put wireless station HAM on the air; however, it was war correspondent Percy Greenwood whose story in a New York medical publication gave the "original HAM story" its start. As told to Fisk, station HAM was not located at Harvard, but at Roxbury High School. After corresponding with Hyman, Fisk concluded that the story had nothing to do with the fact that radio amateurs are called "hams"; rather, the term goes back to the early days of wire telegraphy when unskilled, incompetent operators were pejoratively called hams by their more experienced colleagues.

The 1909 Wireless Registry in the May edition of Modern Electrics listed Earl C. Hawkins of Minneapolis, Minnesota, as operating with the unofficial callsign "H.A.M." according to the Wireless Association of America.

=== Home Amateur Mechanic magazine ===
This version claims "HAM" was an acronym, supposedly derived from the initials of a "very popular" magazine, Home Amateur Mechanic, which covered early radio construction. However, the date of the issue is not specified, and neither the United States Library of Congress nor the WorldCat union catalog have any information that a publication with this title ever existed.

=== Hertz–Armstrong–Marconi ===
It is sometimes claimed that HAM came from the first letter from the last names of three radio pioneers: Heinrich Rudolf Hertz, Edwin Armstrong, and Guglielmo Marconi. However, this cannot be the source of the term as Armstrong was an unknown high school student when the term first appeared.

=== Hammarlund legend ===
Likely an example of corporate wishful thinking, Hammarlund products were supposedly so preeminent in the pioneering era of radio that they became a part of the language of radio. As the story goes, early radio enthusiasts affectionately referred to Hammarlund products as "Ham" products, and called themselves "Ham" operators. In truth, Hammarlund was a minor and barely known company when created in 1910, at the time "ham" was already gaining currency in the radio field. And its first products for use in electronic equipment, variable capacitors, were developed by Hammarlund in 1916, while its first radio products were built in about 1925.
