= Vintage amateur radio =

Amateur radio hobby involving vintage radio equipment

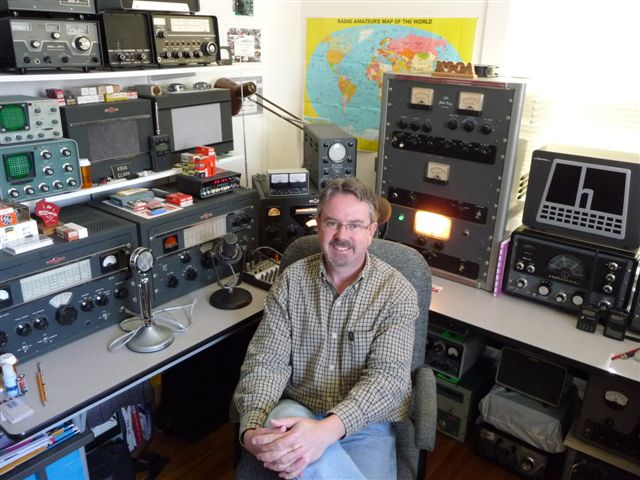
Amateur radio operator's "Radio shack" with vintage gear

Vintage amateur radio is a subset of the amateur radio hobby where enthusiasts collect, restore, preserve, build, and operate amateur radio equipment from bygone years, such as those using vacuum tube technology. Popular modes of operation include speaking over amplitude modulation (AM), and communicating using Morse code through continuous wave (CW) radiotelegraphy. Some enthusiasts have interest in owning, restoring and operating vintage military and commercial radio equipment such as those from 1940s to 1960s. Some construct their own gear, known in ham slang as homebrewing, using vintage parts and designs. A number of amateur radio clubs and organizations sponsor contests, events, and swap meets that cater to this specialized aspect of the hobby.

== Appeal ==
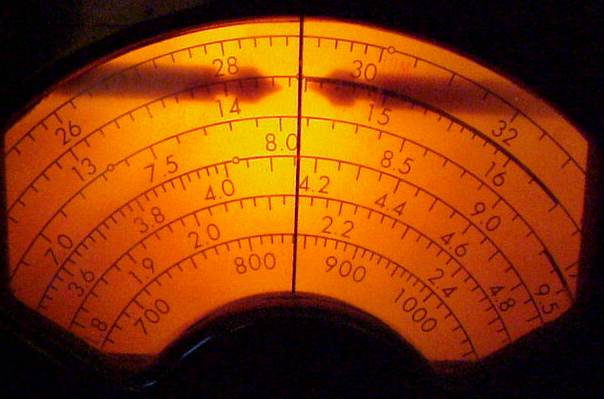
Hallicrafters SX-28 tuning dial

Vintage radio enthusiasts contend that the precise digital frequency displays and state-of-the-art, microprocessor-based features of modern amateur equipment lack the aesthetic appeal and "soul" of amateur electronic gear from the vacuum tube era. Additionally, many find satisfaction in taking commercially-made amateur equipment from the 1930s–1970s, often characterized as boat anchors by US amateurs because of their large size and weight, and carefully restoring it.

Audio recording of voice transmission by amateur station N3WWL using vacuum tube gear

The proliferation of integrated circuits in modern amateur radio equipment has made amateurs nostalgic for vacuum tube-based designs. Radios that contain solid state parts do not require frequent tinkering, whereas vacuum tube radio equipment is less predictable, lending routine radio contacts more excitement, and giving vintage amateur radio devotees a more primitive experience. Enthusiasts claim that boat anchors sound better than modern equipment, saying that the tube audio from vintage gear is "warmer" and more aesthetically pleasing.

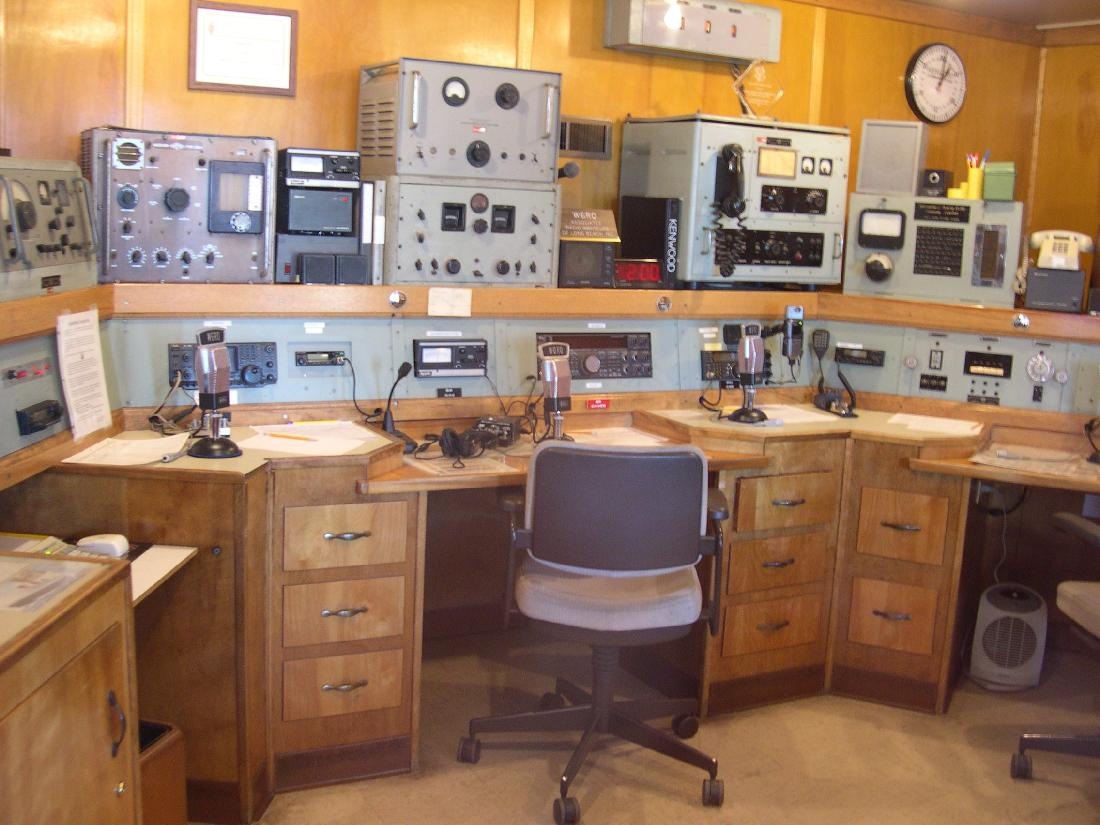
Vintage equipment in the Queen Mary radio room

Some hobbyists see vintage radio operation as a valuable asset to help preserve the history and heritage of radio for future generations. They sometimes assist in the restoration and operation of vintage radio equipment for historical exhibits, museums, and historic ships or aircraft. Examples of this are groups of amateurs who restore, maintain, and operate the radio installations of the ocean liner Queen Mary, the engineering heritage site Musick Memorial Radio Station, and the National Register of Historic Places listed Massie Wireless Station. Amateur restoration of historic military radios includes the B-17 Flying Fortress City of Savannah at the National Museum of the Mighty Eighth Air Force, the B-29 Superfortress Enola Gay at the National Air and Space Museum, and the submarine USS Requin at the Carnegie Science Center. Amateur radio operators on various retired maritime vessels, such as the destroyer USS Kidd and the battleship USS Texas, regularly use vintage transmitters to communicate with other ship museums for events like Museum Ships Weekend and National Pearl Harbor Remembrance Day.

== AM activity ==
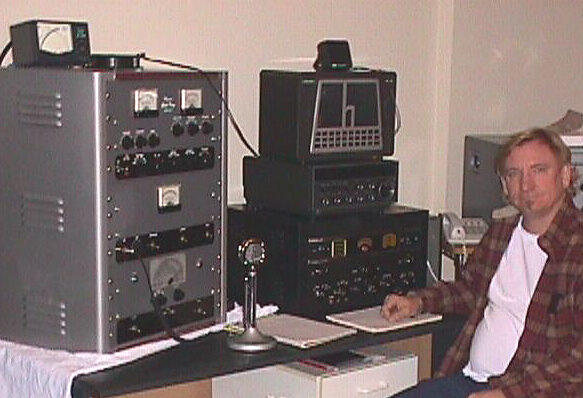
"AM'er" Joe Walsh WB6ACU on the air

Audio recording of Joe Walsh on the air

Amplitude modulation (AM) was once the main voice mode in amateur radio before being superseded by Single-sideband modulation (SSB). But AM has recently become a nostalgic specialty interest on the shortwave ham bands. A number of AMers operate vintage vacuum tube transmitters in conjunction with separate receivers. Some operators have even obtained old AM broadcast transmitters from radio stations that have upgraded their equipment. Others build their equipment from scratch (called homebrewing) using both modern and vintage-era components. Rock star Joe Walsh is an advocate of amateur radio and an avid vintage gear collector, maintaining nine complete vintage stations in his home, including a Collins broadcast transmitter.

In the United States, amateur radio AM activity can be found on mediumwave, MF and shortwave, HF frequencies (in MHz) which include 1.880-1.890, 3.885, 7.290, 14.286, 21.390, and 29.000-29.200, and feature swap nets that cater to interest in vintage AM equipment.

AM operation has drawn interest from people outside the hobby, such as shortwave radio listeners using inexpensive receivers available to the public. While focused on simple technologies from the past, AMers may also mix state-of-the-art technology with their vintage interests, such as experimenting with synchronous detection to enable reception of AM signals free of static and fading.

Conversations ("QSO"s in ham slang) are typically configured as "roundtables" consisting of several participants. Interested newcomers are usually encouraged to switch their modern transceivers to AM mode, introduce themselves, and join the conversation.

== Classic gear ==
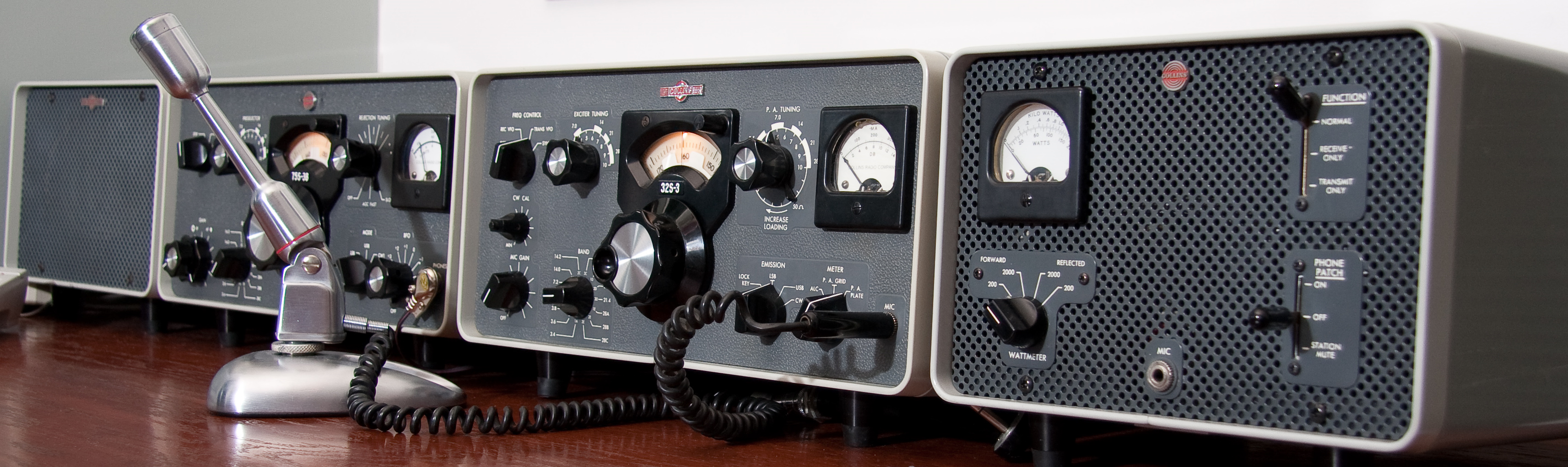
Collins S-Line, featuring separate power supply, receiver, transmitter, and speaker console, c. 1960s

Amateur radio equipment of past eras like the 1940s, 50s, and 60s that are separate vacuum tube transmitters and receivers (unlike modern transceivers) are an object of nostalgia, and many see rehabilitation and on-air use by enthusiasts.

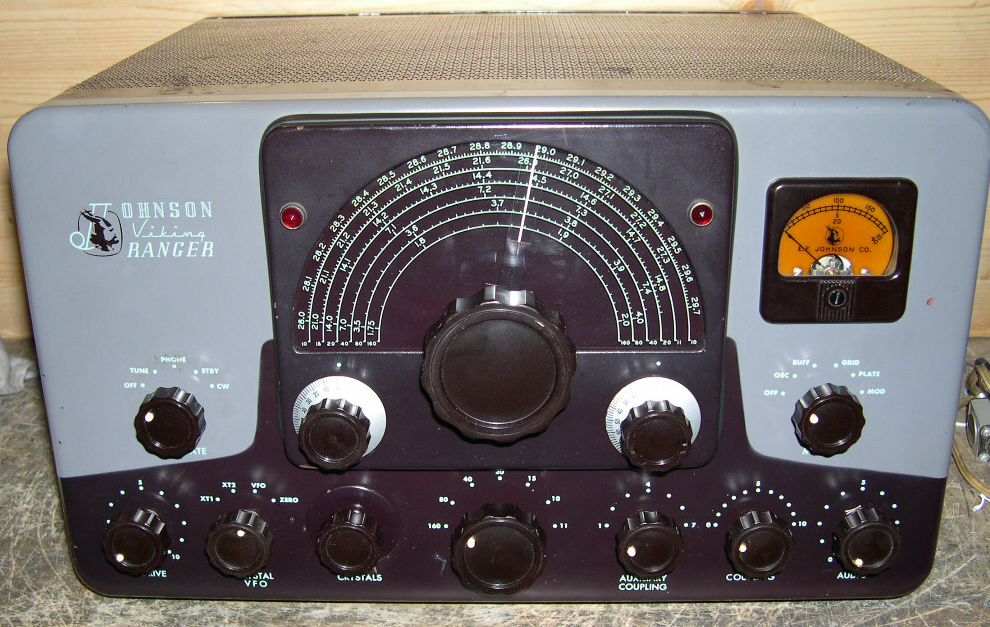
EF Johnson Viking Ranger transmitter, c. 1958

Vintage operating activity is not limited to the AM mode. Many devotees use their "classic" amateur gear from vintage-era American manufacturers like Eico, EF Johnson, National, Heathkit, Hammarlund, Drake, Collins, WRL, Swan, Signal/One, Lafayette and Hallicrafters, to make radiotelegraphy (CW), SSB, FM and RTTY two-way contacts.

Some enthusiasts define the age parameters of vintage or classic gear as “old enough to exhibit the glow of vacuum tubes”, but the designation may include some early solid state gear.

Some even sub-specialize in military radio collecting and undertake to restore and operate surplus communications equipment, much of it dating back to World War II, from AN/ARC-5 command sets and US Signal Corps SCR-300 and SCR-536 walkie talkies to exotic gear like the British Paraset, a small espionage transceiver supplied to Resistance forces in France, Belgium and the Netherlands.

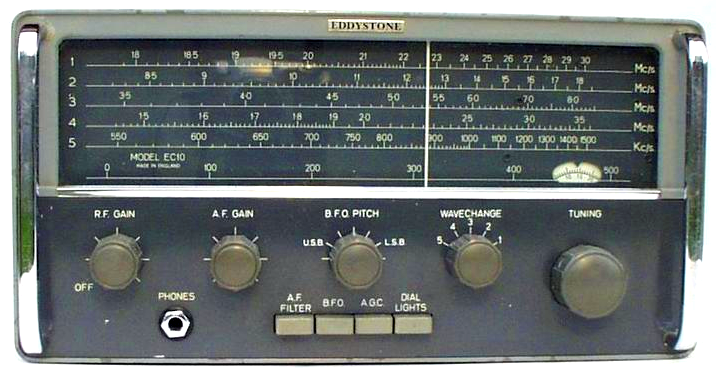
Eddystone EC10 shortwave receiver c. 1967

There is considerable interest in vintage military and commercial radio equipment among EU amateur radio operators, especially gear from British manufacturers such as Marconi, Racal, Eddystone, Pye, and a variety of Russian, German, Canadian, British RAF and British Army equipment, such as the well known Wireless Set No. 19.

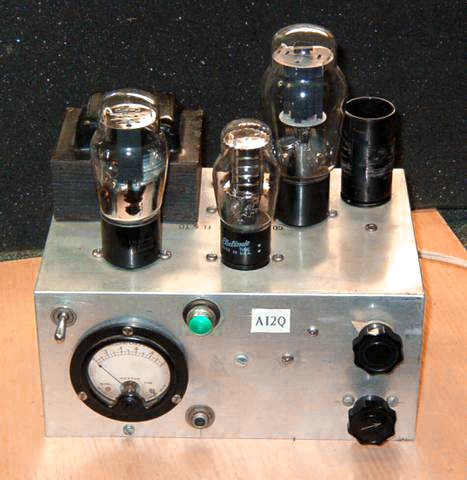
Vacuum tube transmitter

"Glowbugs" are a related aspect of vintage radio and harken back to the early days of amateur radio, when the majority of hams hand-crafted their own equipment. Smaller in size than "boat anchors", "glowbug" is a term used by US amateurs to describe a simple home-made tube-type radio set. The majority of glowbug transmitters are designed to be used in the CW radiotelegraphy mode.

Glowbug transmitters having simple, tube-based designs were part of many beginner ham stations. According to author Richard H. Arland, interest in glowbugs has increased among QRP enthusiasts and others with a penchant for constructing their own equipment, and many hams are assembling simple HF CW transmitters. Amateur radio Glowbug enthusiasts can often be heard communicating on the shortwave bands via CW using Morse code.

== Clubs, events, and publications ==
Many vintage radio clubs sponsor special events and contests, such as the "AM QSO Party" sponsored by the Antique Wireless Association, the "Heavy Metal Rally" sponsored by Electric Radio Magazine, and the "Classic Radio Exchange". Such operating events are not traditional ham radio contests inasmuch as they are a night of friendly QSO’s using home-built, restored commercial ham, broadcast or military equipment. The Antique Radio Club of Illinois operates a vintage radio station as a public demonstration at the Antique RadioFest allowing licensed amateurs who visit to operate the transmitter.

The Amateur Radio Lighthouse Society and The AM Radio Network's "Expedition to Thomas Point Shoal Lighthouse" in Chesapeake Bay, MD commemorated the history of lighthouses with a vintage special event station using the call sign K3L.

Britain's Vintage and Military Amateur Radio Society, affiliated with the Radio Society of Great Britain, coordinates regular on-air "nets" where enthusiasts gather as well as massive technical files for the benefit of members. The Surplus Radio Society, a Dutch society of collectors of old ex-military radio equipment and other nostalgic receivers and transmitters holds weekly radio activity nets every Sunday on 3.575 MHz CW / 3.705 MHz AM and sponsors several flea markets and exchange fairs each year.

The Wireless Set No. 19 Group, with members virtually worldwide, caters to those who collect, restore and/or operate vintage military communications equipment, with emphasis on the World War II Wireless Set No. 19 radio. Many members are Amateur Radio operators who use the equipment for on-air contacts with others.

The ARRL published "Vintage Radio", a collection of articles from QST magazine describing vintage equipment, restoration, and operation.

The Antique Wireless Association of Southern Africa is devoted to the "maintenance and preservation of our amateur heritage" for enthusiasts of older types of short wave radios and amateur equipment, and maintains a museum exhibit in Johannesburg.

== Restoration ==
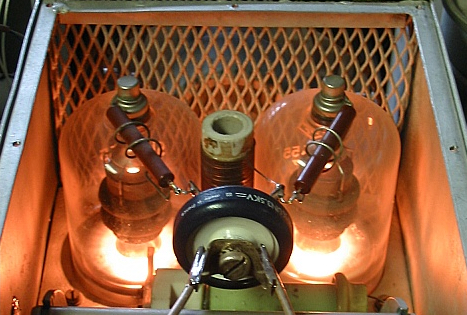
Glowing cathodes in two transmitting vacuum tubes

Repair and restoration of vintage amateur radio equipment may involve replacing vacuum tubes, reforming electrolytic capacitors if needed, replacing any faulty resistors, replacing two-wire power cords with three-wire cords except on transformerless AC/DC radios, and receiver alignment as necessary.

Since vacuum tube gear contains potentially lethal voltages, a number of safety measures, such as discharging power-supply capacitors and keeping one hand away from the chassis when working on powered-up gear, are commonly employed. Some older equipment has a direct connection to the metal chassis on one side of the incoming AC power line, which results in the entire unit becoming electrified if the power plug is inserted backwards. Many older radios, such as vintage receivers, are not safety-fused. In addition, those who collect, restore or otherwise use vintage radio equipment may unknowingly encounter harmful radioactive substances, PCBs, and asbestos.

== See also ==
- Antique radio
- Tube sound
