= Signal One =

Signal One may refer to:

- Signal One (1994 film), an Australian crime film
- Signal One (2026 film), a science fiction film

== See also ==
- Signal/One, a manufacturer of radio communications transceivers
- Signal 1, a radio station now called Hits Radio Staffordshire & Cheshire
