= Clay Jones =

Clay Jones may refer to:

- Clay Jones (horticulturist) (1923–1996), British horticulturist and broadcaster
- Clay Jones (cartoonist) (born 1966), American editorial cartoonist
- Clay Jones (racing driver), American stock car racing driver

== See also ==
- Clayton Jones (disambiguation)
