= Athena Technologies =

American control and navigation solutions for UAVs manufacturer

Athena Technologies was a developer and manufacturer of control and navigation solutions for unmanned aerial vehicles (UAVs) and unmanned ground vehicles (UGVs). In April 2008, Athena was purchased by Rockwell Collins, Inc. for US$107 million.

Athena Technologies was founded in 1998. It was headquartered in Warrenton, Virginia. The company was created to develop and commercialize flight control technologies. Athena founder Dr. David Vos studied control theory at the Massachusetts Institute of Technology (MIT) where he proved the control technology by developing the first autonomous unicycle. In August 2014, Dr. Vos became the head of Google's Project Wing.

Athena's GuideStar product line provides INS/GPS solutions that integrate IMU, GPS, magnetometer and air data signals for dynamic maneuvering. Athena's products have been deployed on a variety of unmanned systems.
