= Teldix =

German aircraft electronics company

Teldix GmbH was a significant German aircraft electronics (military avionics) company, in the field of aircraft navigation.

== History ==
It was established in 1960 by Telefunken and Bendix Corporation (USA). Another company similar at the time was Ottico Meccanica Italiana (OMI), of Italy. In 1973 Teldix was acquired by Robert Bosch GmbH and became part of their division "Kommunikationstechnik - Bosch Telecom" in July 1989. In 2005, the company was acquired by Rockwell Collins.

=== Aviation ===
In the late 1960s it made Head-Up Displays for fighter aircraft. It was partly responsible for the head-up display of the Panavia Tornado. Among other things, Teldix supplied gyroscopes and accelerometers for the HAWK anti-aircraft missile of the German Federal Armed Forces.

The company developed much of the electronics for the Eurofighter Typhoon, notably its Defensive Aids Computer (DAC).

=== Automotive ===
In the early 1970s it developed an anti-skid (ABS) system for Mercedes-Benz which signed an agreement with Teldix that allowed other German car makers to use the system. This was the first commercial-available anti-lock braking system in 1978.

== Structure ==
It was headquartered at Grenzhöfer Weg 36 in Wieblingen, Heidelberg, in Baden-Württemberg, off the L637 road, north of the junction of the Bundesautobahn 656 and Bundesautobahn 5.

== Products ==
- Air navigation equipment
- Anti-lock braking systems (it invented them)
- Moving map displays for aircraft

== See also ==
- Acronyms and abbreviations in avionics
