= World Radio Laboratories =

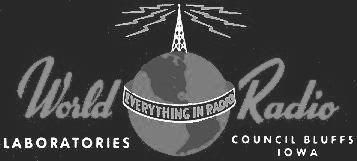

World Radio Laboratories, WRL, was a major supplier of amateur radio equipment from the 1950s to the 1970s. WRL was located in Council Bluffs, Iowa, USA, and run by Leo Meyerson, amateur callsign W0GFQ, and his family.

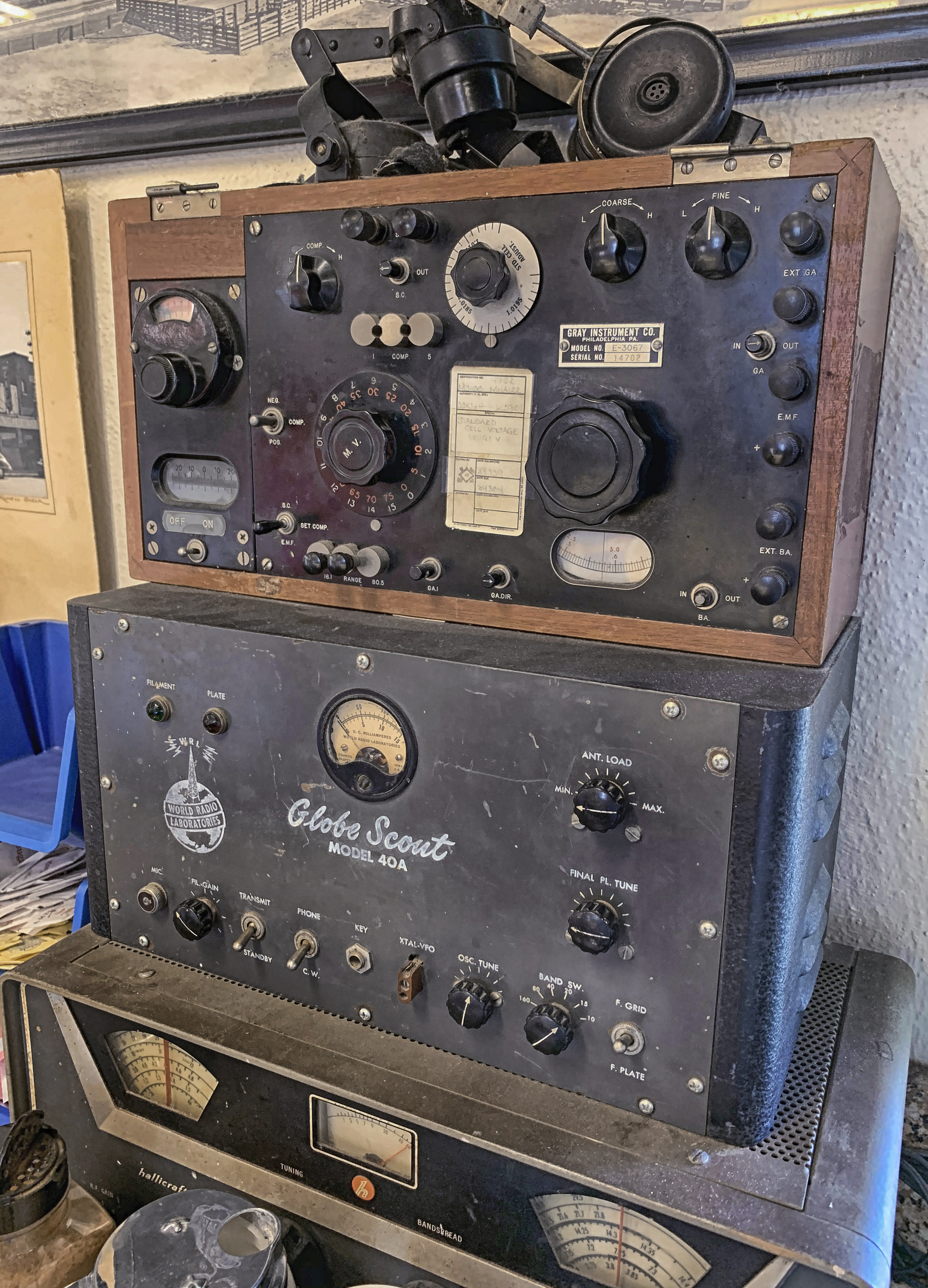
Gray Instrument-Globe Scout Cluster

WRL manufactured some of its own products, notably under the Globe and Galaxy brand names. Globe Champion transmitter models appeared in 1948 and were reportedly the first to have the Globe logo on the front panel. The Champion covered 160-10 meters with a power input rating of 150 watts. A companion speech amplifier and modulator were sold as accessories. WRL Globe subsequently produced other amateur transmitters including the Globe King, Globe Scout, Globe Chief and the Globe SideBander.

In 1960, the Globe line was sold to Textron.

A former resident of Omaha, Nebraska, Meyerson died on April 13, 2011, in Rancho Mirage, California. He was 100.

== See also ==
- Vintage amateur radio
