= National Radio Company =

The National Radio Company, headquartered in Malden, Massachusetts, United States, was an American manufacturer of radio equipment from 1914 to 1991.

== History ==
The company was incorporated, in 1914, as the "National Toy Company", but by 1916 had included household appliances in their product range. This expansion led to the name change to the "National Company, Inc.". By 1923 the product line included toys, food mixers, and radio components. Radio components were to play an important part in the company's growth in the mid-1920s as they moved into the large scale manufacture of capacitors. It was at this time that two engineers from Harvard University, Fred H. Drake and Glen Browning, approached National to manufacture components to their specifications for a radio receiver of their own design. This relationship led to the production and sale of the "National Regenaformer" kit for home construction of the Browning-Drake design. The set was capable of tuning the standard AM broadcast band only and could not achieve shortwave reception. By the early 1930s National had established a reputation with the amateur radio community based upon their line of regenerative receivers, including the SW-3 and SW-5.

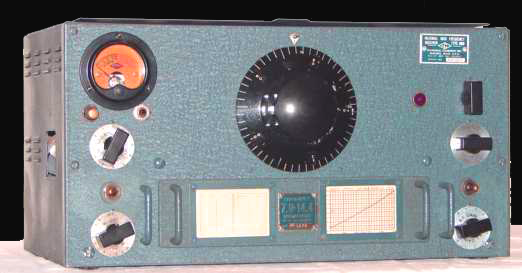
National HRO receiver, circa 1938

Logo of National Company, late 1940s

In 1935 National introduced their top-of-the-line HRO receiver. This radio included two RF stages and a crystal filter. The distinctive dial allowed kc (kHz) resettability and was a National trademark into the 1960s. With few changes other than to keep up with changing tube technology, this same basic design survived for over 20 years.

National began providing equipment to the United States and Allied government customers such as the Royal Navy in 1939. After the U.S. declared war in 1941, National was advised by the military to "Start building HROs; we'll tell you when to stop." National began producing for the war effort, and the number of employees went from approximately 200 to about 2,500 during the war. The war effort brought increased recognition and profits to National and after the war, in the late 1940s, National went public.

In 1947, a National model NC-173 receiver went along with Thor Heyerdahl on the Kon-Tiki expedition.

During the period in the 1950s and '60s, (under the name "NRCI" National Radio Company Incorporated ) National produced a wide range of amateur radio equipment which was advertised extensively in many amateur radio publications. Usually new equipment was first shown in this publication in order to initiate marketing of a new item. The company would mainly opt for the inside back cover which they believed would gain prominence for their new wares. In addition, around Christmas time each year National would produce tempting advertisements festooned with holly leaves. In the late 1950s, National asked the readers of QST what they wanted in a new ham radio receiver, with the result being the National NC-300 (and its successor, the NC-303). It featured a rare 30–35 MHz input for converters for 50, 144 and 220 MHz use (220 MHz equipment was very rare at the time). In 1965, National introduced the solid state HRO 500, which did not incorporate the HRO dial system, but instead relied on a direct readout rather than a conversion scale or chart. At the time, Popular Electronics magazine reviewed the HRO 500 as "possibly the best amateur receiver ever". Today, many National radios are collected, restored and operated by vintage amateur radio enthusiasts.

Through the 1970s and 1980s, National survived as a government contractor and ceased development and production of civilian equipment. However, by 1991, after continuing difficulties, the company ceased trading.

=== Atomichron ===
The National Radio Company built the world's first commercial atomic clock, named the Atomichron. It was also the first self-contained portable atomic clock and was a caesium standard clock. More than 50 clocks with the trademarked Atomichron name were produced.

== See also ==
- Collins Radio
- E.F. Johnson
- Hallicrafters
- Hammarlund
- R.L. Drake
