= Clayton M. Jones =

Clayton M. Jones (born c. 1952) is the former chairman of Rockwell Collins.

He grew up in Nashville, Tennessee. He studied at the University of Tennessee and George Washington University. He served as a fighter pilot in the U.S. Air Force before joining Rockwell International.

He served on the board of directors of the Unisys Corporation and General Aviation Manufacturers Association as well as on the board of governors of the Aerospace Industry Association. He was a member of the National Security Telecommunications Advisory Committee. He was an Honorary Fellow of the American Institute of Aeronautics and Astronautics.

== Education ==
Jones graduated from the University of Tennessee in 1971 with a degree in political science.
