= Louis Clayton Jones =

American lawyer (1935–2006)

Louis Clayton Jones (November 13, 1935 – January 9, 2006) was an American international attorney and civil rights leader. An outspoken proponent for equal rights, he was a founder of the National Conference of Black Lawyers.

== Background ==
A native of Lexington, Kentucky, Jones received a bachelor's degree from Howard University in Washington, D.C., from which he graduated summa cum laude in 1957 with majors in Philosophy and French. In 1956, he was inducted into the membership of Phi Beta Kappa and in 1957 was awarded a Fulbright Scholarship for study in France at the Sorbonne and the University of Bordeaux, where he studied political science and French literature. In 1958 he received a John Hay Whitney Fellowship and was accepted for admission to Yale Law School. He graduated in 1961.

Upon returning from his home state in 1961, Jones was asked to serve as Assistant Director of the newly formed Kentucky Commission on Human Rights and was responsible for drafting that commission's Complaint and Compliance Procedures. After addressing an NAACP meeting in the Court House at Murray, Ky., and learning from Gov. Bert Combs that he would be arrested if he set foot in Murray again, Jones recalled in his third-person autobiographical sketch, he removed himself from the jurisdiction of his home state to seek more hospitable environments and ended up in New York City where he practiced law from 1962 to 1968.

In the mid-1980s, he played a prominent role as counsel to the family of Michael Stewart, a 25-year-old Brooklyn man arrested for scrawling graffiti in a subway station at First Avenue and 14th Street in Manhattan. While in police custody Stewart received injuries that would later be the cause of his death. The police officers were charged with brutality but acquitted. A former law partner with David Dinkins, Mr. Jones sometimes criticized Black public officials. In a letter published in the New York Times (August 8, 1986), he chastised former Atlanta mayor Andrew Young for the ex-U.N. Ambassador's letter to Bishop Desmond Tutu (Op-Ed, July 27) in support of the Administration's approach to economic sanctions against South Africa. He worked internationally helping to develop the government of Liberia and managing financial affairs for First Investment Capital Corporation, a Paris-based subsidiary of Al-Anwae Trading Company of Saudi Arabia.

At the end of 1985, Jones was asked to become Director of Legal and Financial Affairs. While in Paris, Jones was introduced to Charles Haimoff, CEO of Horphag Overseas, Ltd., the international distributor of the world's most powerful and effective anti-oxidant, Pycnogenol. In 1988, Jones purchased the exclusive rights to distribute Pycnogenol in North America. After establishing Pycnogenol as the standard of the anti-oxidant industry in America, Jones retired from his company and from the practice of law. Since the early 1990s, he had devoted all of his time to the goals enunciated in the pages of a quarterly journal he edited for several years, The African Century

He was the publisher of The New African and The Cyber-Drum, an Internet Web site that included daily coverage of and commentary on the most important events affecting African and Developing World people.

Jones died of cancer at his home on January 9, 2006. He was 70 years old.

== Obituaries ==
- Black Star News, January 12, 2006.
- The Amsterdam News, January 11, 2006.
