= Albert Hyman =

Albert Salisbury Hyman (1893 - 1972), a Harvard-trained New York cardiologist, together with his brother Charles, constructed in 1930-1932 an electromechanical device which was one of the earliest artificial pacemakers. The device was reportedly tested on experiment animals and at least one human patient.

The first artificial pacemaker was invented by Australian anaesthesiologist Dr Mark C Lidwell. He used it to resuscitate a newborn baby at the Crown Street Women's Hospital, Sydney in 1926. However, Hyman used and popularised the term "artificial pacemaker," which remains in use today.

Lidwell did not patent his invention and remained anonymous for many years to avoid public controversy. Hyman's machine did not gain general acceptance from the medical community, which opposed him in his attempts to popularise the use of his version of the invention.
