= Rockwell Collins =

Defunct US-based electronics company (2001–2018)

Rockwell Collins, Inc.

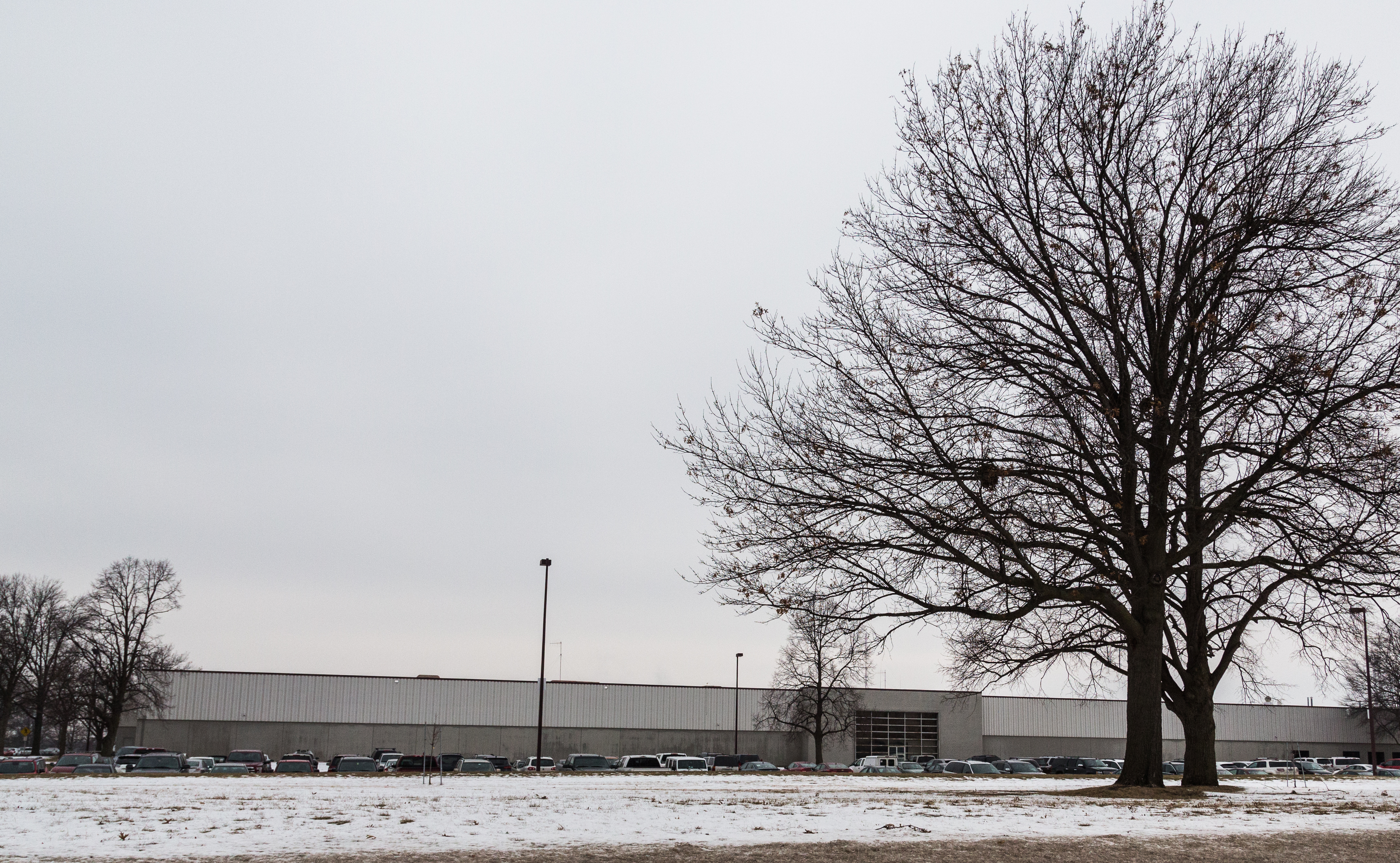
- Type: Subsidiary
- Industry: Aerospace, Defense
- Predecessors: Collins Radio Company; Rockwell International
- Founded: 2001; 25 years ago
- Defunct: November 27, 2018
- Fate: Acquired by United Technologies Corporation and merged with UTC Aerospace Systems to form Collins Aerospace
- Headquarters: Cedar Rapids, Iowa, U.S.
- Revenue: ▲US$6.822 billion (2017)
- Operating income: ▲US$1.102 billion (2017)
- Net income: ▼US$705 million (2017)
- Number of employees: 31,200 (2018)

Rockwell Collins, Inc. was a multinational corporation headquartered in Cedar Rapids, Iowa, providing avionics and information technology systems and services to government agencies and aircraft manufacturers. It was formed when the Collins Radio Company, facing financial difficulties, was purchased by Rockwell International in 1973. In 2001, the avionics division of Rockwell International was spun off to form the current Rockwell Collins, Inc., retaining its name.

It was acquired by United Technologies Corporation on November 27, 2018, and since then operates as part of Collins Aerospace, a subsidiary of the RTX Corporation (formerly Raytheon Technologies).

== History ==
Arthur A. Collins founded Collins Radio Company in 1933 in Cedar Rapids, Iowa. It designed and produced both shortwave radio equipment and equipment for the AM radio broadcast industry. Collins supplied the military, the scientific community, and the larger AM radio stations with equipment. Collins provided the equipment to establish a communications link with the South Pole expedition of Rear Admiral Richard E. Byrd in 1933.

In 1936, Collins had begun production of the 12H audio console, 12X portable field announcers box, and the 300E and 300F broadcast transmitters. Throughout World War II, the 212A1 and 212B1 replaced the 12H design. Collins became the principal supplier of radio and navigation equipment used in the military.

In the postwar years, the Collins Radio Company expanded its work in the communications field, while broadening its technology into flight-control instruments, radio-communication devices, and satellite voice transmissions. Collins Radio Company provided communications for the United States' role in the Space Race, including equipment for astronauts to communicate with earth stations and equipment to track and communicate with spacecraft. Collins communications equipment was used for Projects Mercury, Gemini and Apollo.

In 1973, the U.S. Skylab program used Collins equipment to provide communication from the astronauts to Earth.

=== Rockwell Collins ===
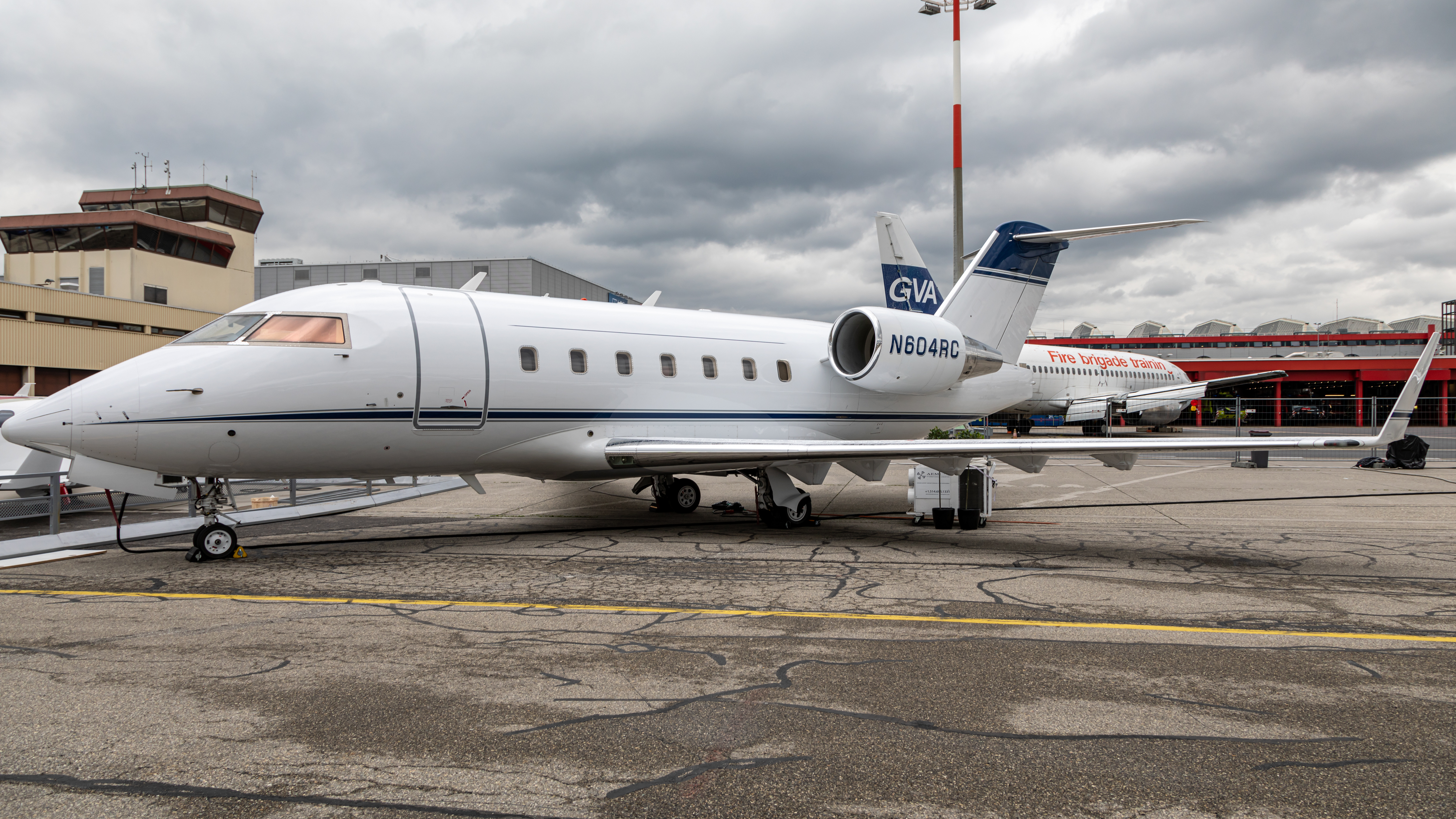
Rockwell Collins avionics demonstrator aircraft

After facing financial difficulties, the Collins Radio Company was purchased by Rockwell International in 1973. In 2001, the avionics division of Rockwell International was spun off to form Rockwell Collins, Inc, retaining its name. Rockwell Collins was highly concentrated in the defense and commercial avionics markets, and no longer marketed receivers to the public.

On April 28, 2000, Rockwell International Corp and its Rockwell Collins unit agreed to acquire Sony Corp's Sony Trans Com (Irvine, California), a manufacturer of inflight entertainment systems, for undisclosed terms. Sony had purchased the business from Sundstrand Corporation in 1989. On December 20, 2000, Rockwell Collins expanded its services to commercial and executive aviation in Mercosur countries.

The company had acquired several companies, including Hughes-Avicom's in-flight entertainment business (1998), Sony Trans Com (2000), Intertrade Ltd., Flight Dynamics, K Systems, Inc. (Kaiser companies), Communication Solutions, Inc., Airshow, Inc. (2002), NLX (Simulation Business) in 2003, portions of Evans & Sutherland, TELDIX GmbH, IP Unwired, Anzus Inc. in 2006, Information Technology and Applications Corp in 2007, Athena Technologies, Datapath Inc. (divested in 2014), SEOS Displays Ltd., Air Routing International in 2010, Computing Technologies for Aviation (CTA) in 2011, ARINC in 2014, and BE Aerospace in 2017.

The company was among the major suppliers of in-flight entertainment (IFE). Rockwell Collins' key competitors in this industry included Panasonic Avionics Corporation, Thales Group, and JetBlue's IFE subsidiary LiveTV, which was later purchased by Thales in 2014 for $400 million.

In 2010, the company employed over 20,000 people and had an annual turnover of US$4.665 billion. Its nonexecutive chairman was Anthony Carbone following the retirement of Clayton M. Jones. In September 2012, Kelly Ortberg was appointed as president of the company. In August 2013, Kelly Ortberg was appointed CEO of Rockwell Collins.

==== Acquisition by United Technologies ====
On September 4, 2017, United Technologies of Farmington, Connecticut, agreed to acquire the company for $30 billion. The transaction closed on November 26, 2018.

== Past products ==
=== Broadcast transmitters ===
Starting in the mid-1930s, the Collins Radio Company constructed and sold transmitters and audio mixing consoles to the broadcast industry.

In 1939, the model 12 Speech Input Console, in addition to the 26C limiter amplifier, was licensed to Canadian Marconi Co. for both sales in Canada and His Majesty's Service for the war effort. Collins' success in constructing broadcast transmitters continued to grow, selling well over a thousand up to the start of World War II. During World War II, Collins' expertise grew in high-power transmitters, producing designs that ran well over 15 kilowatts (kW) of RF power on a continuous basis. After the war, some AM transmitters were produced, called the 300G, and remain the finest in low-power AM transmitters (300W) ever produced.

Collins remained an important manufacturer of AM and FM broadcast radio transmitters for the commercial market surviving the drastic cost-cutting market of the 1960s and 1970s. The transmitter line was later sold to Continental Electronics, which continued to produce a number of Collins designs under its own nameplate before phasing them out in the 1980s.

=== Shortwave transmitters ===
Collins produced several shortwave transmitters to the commercial market. A "30" Series production catered to the growing need of state highway patrol agencies and Department of Commerce aviation needs. During World War II, Collins produced high-power transmitters for aircraft, notably the ART-13 equipped with automatic tuning circuits, which represented an important enhancement for airborne radio communications.

After World War II, Collins supported both broadcast and the growing postwar amateur radio market. The United States Coast Guard Cutter USCGC Courier was employed as seagoing relay station for Voice of America programming using two Collins 207B-1 transmitters.

Amateur radio transmitters included the 32V-1, -2, and -3, the KWS-1, and the rack-mounted KW-1.

=== Receivers ===
Around 1947, the company introduced their first amateur radio receiver, the 75A-1 (called the 75A). This set achieved excellent stability for the time due to high build quality and the use of a permeability tuned oscillator in its second conversion stage. It was one of the few double-conversion superheterodynes on the market, and covered only the amateur bands.

With the experience gained in the design of the 75A-1, Collins released the 51J-1 receiver, a general-coverage HF set covering 500 kHz to 30 MHz. It was produced in somewhat updated versions (51J-2, 51J-3, 51J-4) for about a decade. It was known as the R-388 and was used in multiple receiver diversity radioteletype installations.

The 75A amateur line was updated throughout the early 1950s, finishing with the 75A-4, which was released in 1955. The Collins mechanical filter was introduced to consumers in the 75A-3, and the 75A-4 was one of the first receivers marketed specifically as a single sideband receiver.

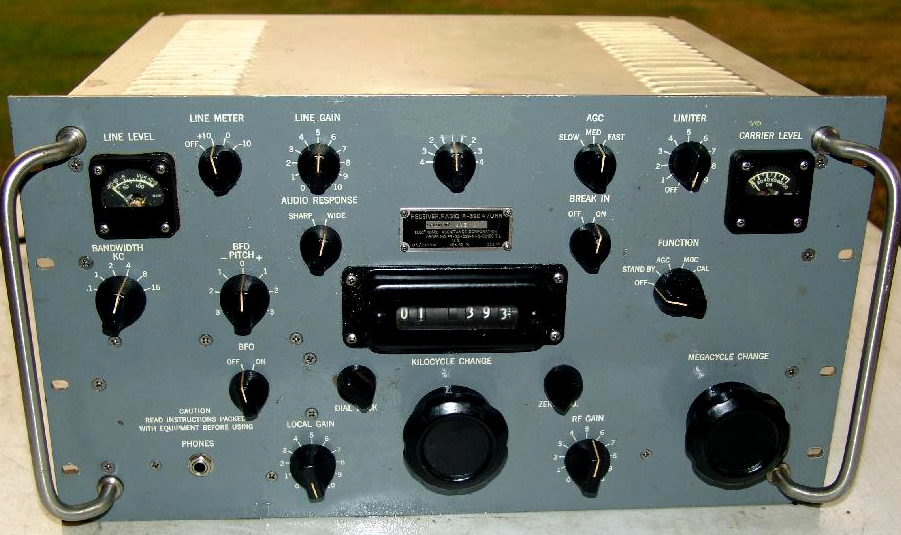
Collins R-390A radio receiver

Around 1950, Collins began designing the R-390 (500 kHz — 30 MHz) for the US military. This was intended to be a receiver of the highest performance available, with the ruggedness and serviceability required for military duty. It featured direct mechanical digital frequency readout. The set is composed of several modules for easy field repair—a bad module could simply be swapped out and repaired later, or junked. Sets built during the original 1951 contract cost the government about US$2,500 (equivalent to $31,010 in 2025) each, and around 16,000 were produced.

Concurrently, Collins developed the R-389, a long-wave version with fewer than 1,000 made. The R-391, another variant of the R-390, allowed choice of eight different autotuned channels.

Three years later, Collins delivered the R-390A to the military. About 54,000 were produced and the set was a military workhorse until the 1970s. Like the R-390, it can outperform many modern radios, to the point that it was designated top secret until the late 1960s.

In 1958, Collins replaced the 75A series with the much smaller 75S series, part of the S/Line. These featured mechanical filters, very accurate frequency readout, and excellent stability. At the request of the US government, Collins designed the 51S-1 general-coverage set, which was essentially (in intended use) a physically smaller replacement for the 51J series. It was not intended as a replacement for the higher-performance R-390A, and unlike the R-390A, it was extensively marketed for commercial use.

Collins produced a few high-performance solid-state receivers in the 1970s, such as the 651S-1. Like their tube predecessors, these are coveted by collectors today.

=== Transceivers and systems ===
With the introduction of the S/Line in 1958, Collins moved from designing individual products that could be used together, to ones that were designed to integrate and operate together, in various combinations, as a system. They were the first equipment maker to take this approach. Collins was also the first to introduce a compact HF transceiver, the KWM-1, the year before. Together, these two innovations put Collins temporarily ahead of its competition, and set the stage for other manufacturers and the next generation of amateur (and military) HF radio equipment.

The 75S-1 receiver and 32S-1 transmitter, comprising the heart of the S/Line, operated separately or together to transceive. The units included crystal band-pass filters and a new compact design that provided stable, highly linear tuning across 200 kHz band segments. The S/Line tuning-dial mechanism was unique when introduced. It used concentric dials and a gear mechanism that provided precise dial resolution, better than 1 kHz.

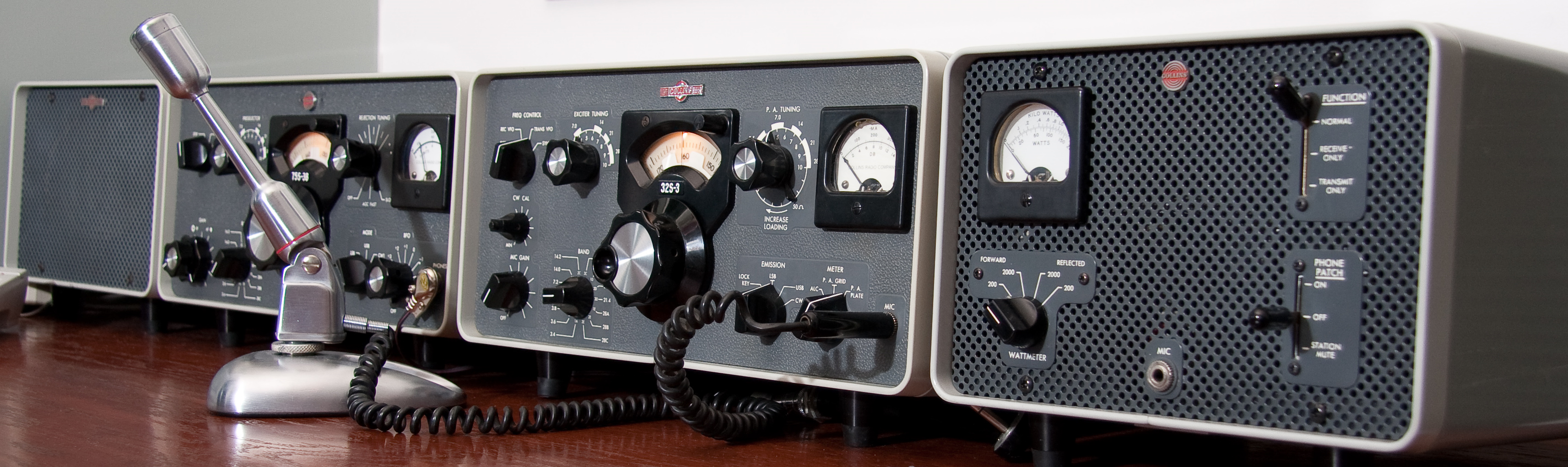
Collins S/Line – 516F-2 power supply, 75S-3B receiver, 32S-3 transmitter, 312B-4 console, SM-1 microphone, c. 1969

Within a few years, Collins had introduced additional S/Line components, including the 30S-1 kilowatt power amplifier, the 30L-1 desktop power amplifier, and the 62S-1 transverter, which provided coverage of the 6-m (50 MHz) and 2-m (144 MHz) amateur bands. The KWM-2 transceiver replaced the KWM-1 using many of the S/Line's design features and matching its styling. Other accessories included speakers, microphones, and control consoles.

Illustrating the uniqueness of their new, smaller units in the market, Collins advertisements in the 1950s and early 1960s emphasized the S/Line's physical styling and size, as often as they did its performance.

Collins continued to improve the S/Line, first introducing the S-2, then the S-3 units, the 75S-3 (and -3A, -3B and -3C) receiver, and the 32S-3 and -3A transmitters. The -3A and -3C units were identical to the -3 and -3B units, respectively, except they provided an extra set of heterodyne oscillator crystals, enabling them to cover extra bands – useful for military, amateur and MARS operation, where operation just outside the regular amateur bands was necessary.

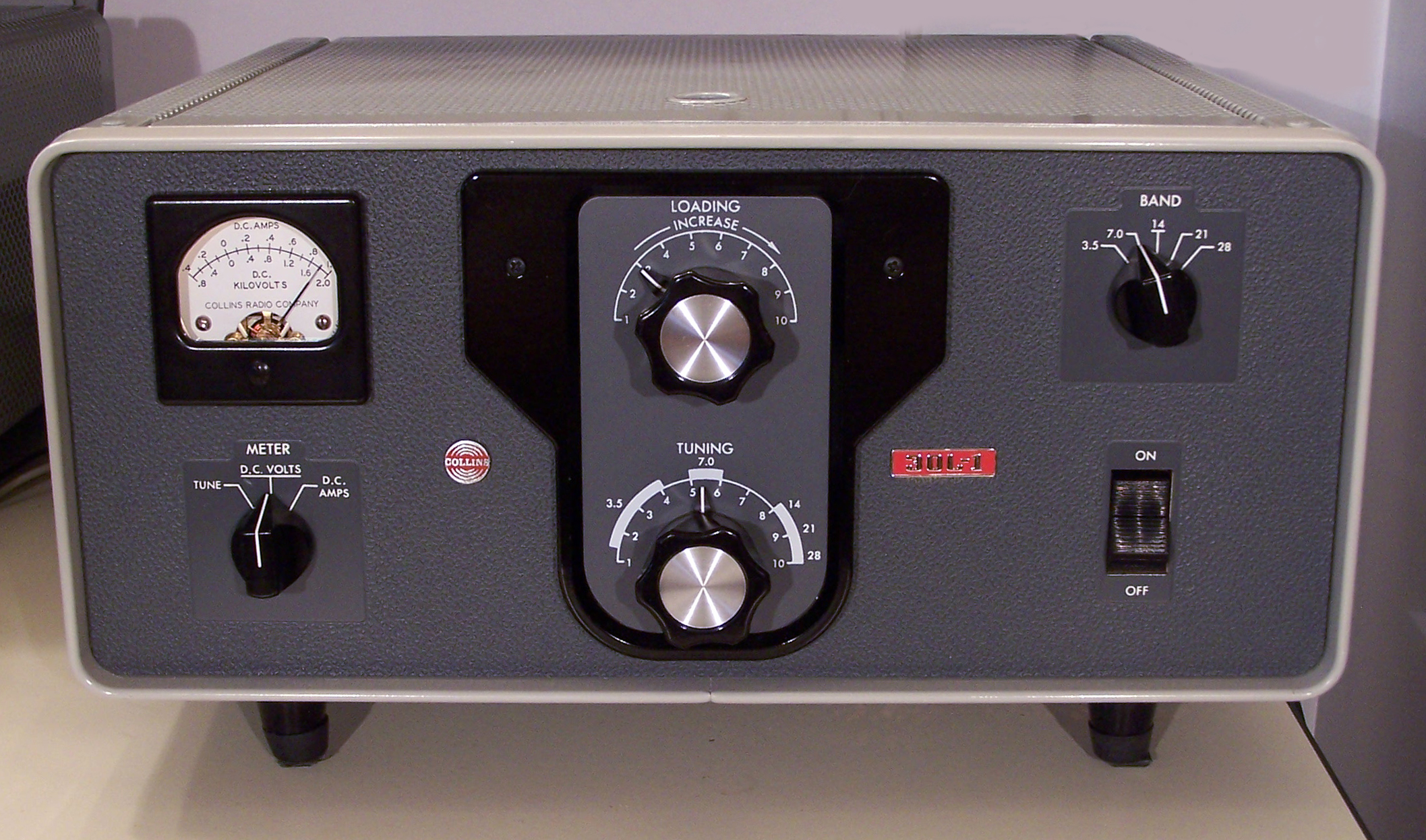
Collins 30L-1 Amplifier c. 1970

Collins continued to produce the S/Line well into the late 1970s, and after its acquisition by Rockwell.

In 1978, with the move to solid-state design, the S/Line came to an end after a two-decade production run. The KWM-380 transceiver was introduced the next year, a break with the past both in its use of transistors and digital technology, and its styling. It was Collins' final entry in the amateur radio market until it was discontinued in the mid-1980s.

=== Computers ===
In the 1960s, the company designed and sold C-System computerized message-switching equipment, built an intranet, and began implementing computer storage of design data for circuit boards and assemblies. They had a goal of automating all functions from parts ordering and inventory to factory scheduling to generation of maintenance provisioning. With products technically successful and far ahead of their time in many respects, Mr. Collins continued to invest in development at a rate that could not be supported by sales when a downturn occurred, and began to have financial problems.

=== Network Transmission Systems ===
In 1991, Rockwell sold its Richardson, Texas-based Network Transmission Systems division to Alcatel.

== Acquisitions ==
In 2008, Rockwell Collins acquired Athena Technologies for US$107 million (equivalent to $160 million in 2025).

=== ARINC Acquisition ===
In August 2013, Rockwell Collins announced the agreement to purchase ARINC. On December 23, 2013, Rockwell Collins announced it had completed its acquisition of ARINC for US$1.4 billion (equivalent to $1.94 billion in 2025). The purchase of ARINC allowed Rockwell Collins to shift their balance in commercial aviation.

=== B/E Aerospace Acquisition ===
In April 2017, Rockwell Collins entered the aircraft cabin interiors market through the acquisition of B/E Aerospace for US$8.3 billion (equivalent to $10.9 billion in 2025). Based in Wellington, Florida, B/E products included seating, food and beverage preparation and storage equipment, lighting and oxygen systems, and modular galley and lavatory systems for commercial airliners and business jets. B/E benefits from rival Zodiac Aerospace's delivery troubles. Retrofit opportunities are provided by its $12 billion installed base. B/E shareholders received 20% of the new Rockwell, which then had $8.1 billion in revenues and $1.9 billion in pretax earnings with nearly 30,000 employees.

Rockwell Collins filed for regulatory approval for its intended acquisition of B/E Aerospace, before the Philippine Competition Commission, since the latter has a branch in the Philippines operating a manufacturing plant in Tanauan, Batangas.

As a result of the acquisition, a newly created direct or indirect subsidiary of Rockwell, Quarterback Merger Sub Corp., merged with and into B/E Aerospace, with the latter surviving the merger as a direct or indirect subsidiary of Rockwell Collins.

== Organizational structure ==
Rockwell Collins has five main divisions:

- Commercial Systems (CS)
- Government Systems (GS)
- International and Service Solutions (I&SS)
- Information Management Services (IMS)
- Interior Systems (IS)

The CS division services the commercial airline industry and business aircraft, providing navigation, communication, synthetic vision, other cockpit products such as autoland autopilots, and cabin products such as in-flight entertainment. The GS division services primarily the US government and military, but also provides some products and services to foreign governments with close ties to the United States. Notable government-related projects that Rockwell Collins has involvement with are Common Avionics Architecture System (CAAS), Joint Tactical Radio System (JTRS), Tactical Targeting Network Technology (TTNT), Defense Advanced GPS Receiver (DAGR), and Future Combat Systems. The I&SS division is an amalgamation of International Business organization, whose responsibility is sales, engineering, and human resources of personnel outside of North America, and Service Solutions, which provides support services such as customer support, simulation and training, and technical publications. I&SS provides a common service to both CS and GS divisions, and its formation was announced on the Rockwell Collins press release web page on February 19, 2010.

== Donald R. Beall Advanced Technology Center ==
The Donald R. Beall Advanced Technology Center is a research and development center within Rockwell Collins that focuses on creating, identifying, and maturing technologies targeted at driving business growth. It maintains a portfolio that balances short-term deliverables focused on core and adjacent markets, with technologies for long-term growth. It has three departments: Advanced Radio Systems, Communications and Navigation Systems, and Embedded Information Systems.

== Collector community ==
As with several other brands of vintage radio equipment, an active community of Collins radio enthusiasts existed, with clubs, web sites, and on-line discussions dedicated to restoring and operating the equipment. The Collins Collectors Association and the Collins Radio Association were two examples of such organizations.

Groups of Collins users have also organized meetings, gatherings at hamfests, and regularly scheduled on-air discussions called nets.

== Tax avoidance ==
In December 2019, CNBC listed Rockwell Collins along with 91 additional Fortune 500 companies that "paid an effective federal tax rate of 0% or less" as a result of the Tax Cuts and Jobs Act of 2017.

== See also ==
- E. F. Johnson Company
- Future Air Navigation System
- Hallicrafters
- Hammarlund
- National Radio Company
- R. L. Drake Company
- Rockwell Automation
- Signal/One
- Vintage amateur radio
- United Technologies Corporation
