= Clayton Jones (judge) =

American judge

Clayton Jones Jr.

Chief Judge of Durham County District Court
- Incumbent
- Assumed office January 1, 2024

Personal details
- Party: Democratic
- Occupation: judge
- Website: claytonjonesforjudge.com

Clayton Jones Jr. is an American judge. He serves as the chief judge of Durham County’s District Court. Following his arrest in December 2025, Jones has been temporarily replaced as chief judge by Doretta L. Walker.

== Career ==
Jones is a member of the North Carolina Democratic Party. He was first elected to office in 2018. Jones serves as a judge for the fifth seat of North Carolina's 16th Judicial District. He assumed office on January 1, 2024. He ran for re-election for judge of the 14th Judicial District and won the election on November 8, 2022.

Following his arrest in December 2025, Jones has been temporarily replaced as chief judge by Doretta L. Walker, a fellow district court judge.

== Personal life ==
Jones was arrested by the Durham Police on December 8, 2025 and charged with one count of assault on a woman and one misdemeanor count of domestic violence. He had already been under a domestic violence protective order in Wake County. He was released on a $500 bond and the case will be heard in a Guilford County court on January 15, 2026.
