= Signal/One =

American radio communications manufacturer

- Industry: Electronics
- Headquarters: St. Petersburg, Florida, United States
- Key people: Dick Ehrhorn (general manager); Don Fowler (project engineer)
- Parent: Electronic Communications, Inc.

Signal/One was a manufacturer of high performance SSB and CW HF radio communications transceivers initially based in St. Petersburg, Florida, United States.

Signal/One Model CX-7 circa 1970. Price when new: US$2395

== History ==
Signal/One's parent company was Electronic Communications, Inc. (ECI), a military division of NCR Corporation located in St. Petersburg, Florida. Key Signal/One executives were general manager Dick Ehrhorn (amateur radio call sign W4ETO), and project engineer Don Fowler (W4YET). Beginning in the 1960s with the Signal/One CX7, ("S1", as they were called) the company made radios that were priced well above the competition and offered many advanced features for the time, such as passband tuning, broadband transmission, dual receive, built-in IAMBIC keyer, electronic digital read out, solid state design, QSK and RF clipping. A Signal/One radio was said to be a complete high performance, station in a box.

While marketed to the affluent radio amateur, it has been suggested that the primary market for Signal/One, like Collins, was military, State Department, and government communications. Although prized for the performance and advanced engineering, Signal/One's products did not sell as well as hoped, and the company gradually fell on hard times. From the 1970s though the 1990s, every few years, Signal/One was spun off, sold, and resurfaced at another location.

== Collectors ==
The surviving Signal/One products are sought after and actively collected. These include the CX7, CX7A, CX7B, CX11 and Milspec models. The last Signal/One radio was a re-engineered ICOM IC-781. Information available indicates there were 1152 Signal Ones built: 850 CX7, 112 CX11, 168 MS1030 (number of "C" versions is not known), 6 MilSpec1030C, 15 MilSpec1030CI Icom IC-781 conversions and 1 Milspec1030E DSP Icom IC-756 Pro conversion.

== See also ==
- Collins Radio
- Icom
- Vintage amateur radio
