= Clay Jones (cartoonist) =

American cartoonist

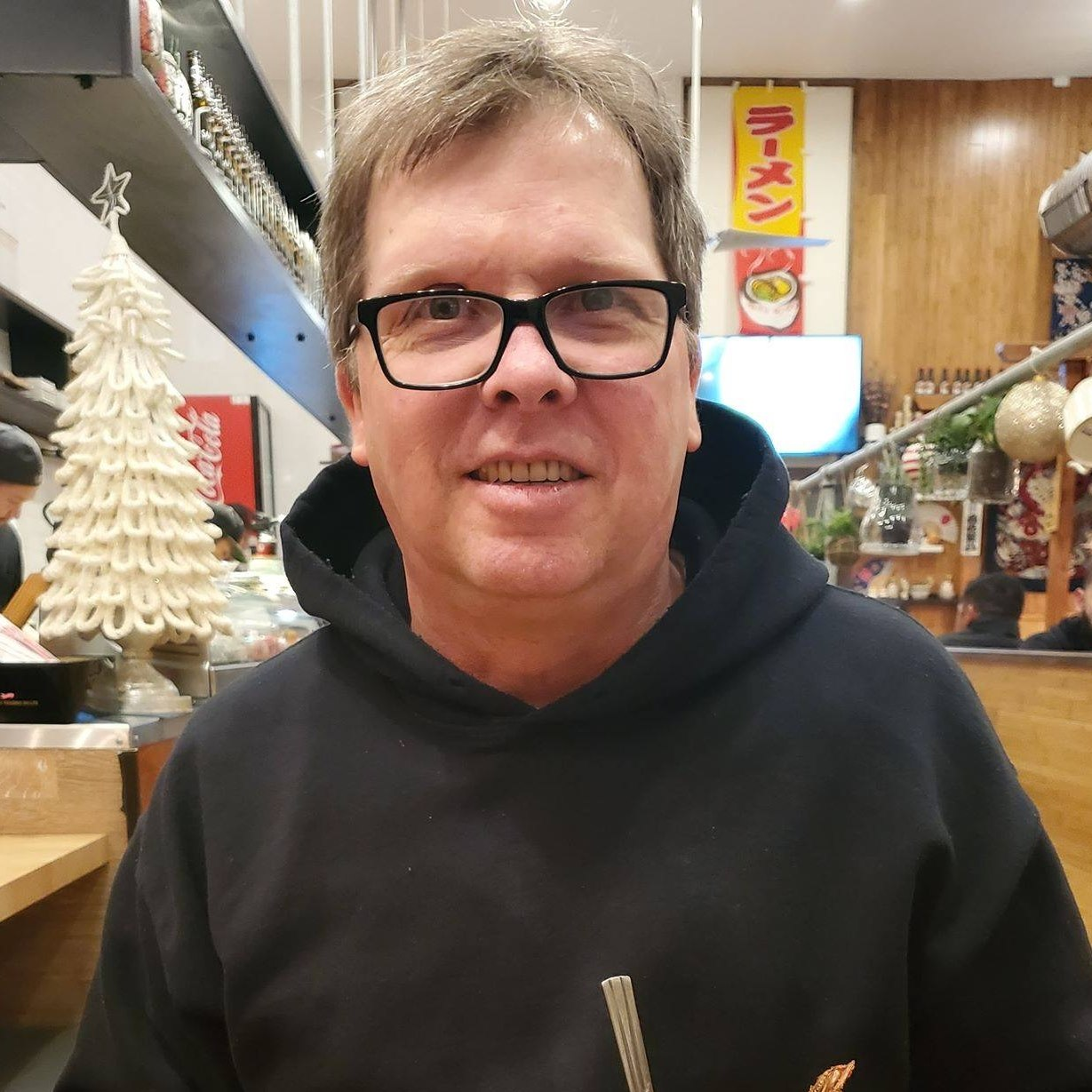
- Self-portrait photograph
- Born: Clayton Jones; June 1, 1966 (age 60) Fort Hood, Texas, U.S.
- Area: Editorial cartoonist

Signature
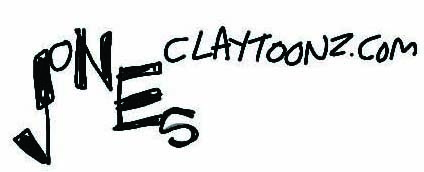

Clayton "Clay" Jones (born June 1, 1966) is an American editorial cartoonist based in Fredericksburg, Virginia. He nationally self-syndicates his political cartoons to newspapers and news sites while also providing a weekly cartoon for CNN Opinion's weekly newsletter, Provoke/Persuade. He was the staff editorial cartoonist for The Free Lance-Star from 1998 to 2012. From 2000 to 2012 his work was syndicated to over 400 publications by Creators Syndicate. Today Jones is self-syndicating his work nationally to over 50 newspapers and news websites from his website, claytoonz.com, where he also occasionally writes a blog. He drew cartoons for The Daily Dot in 2014-2015. He occasionally will create an exclusive cartoon for various publications. Previously, his work was also a feature on the website liberalamerica.org, until he resigned over disagreements of their policy allowing article to be published under pseudonyms and other ethical concerns with the site's news coverage. He briefly returned to The Free Lance-Star in 2014-2015 as a freelancer to contribute a weekly cartoon and a weekly caption contest for fredericksburg.com. He provided a weekly cartoon to The Costa Rica Star from 2016 to 2019.

== Biography ==
Jones was born in Fort Hood, Texas in 1966. His first cartooning job was for The Panolian in Batesville, Mississippi where he worked from 1989 to 1995. He left the Panolian to work for the Daily Leader in Brookhaven, Mississippi, which he left in September of the same year. Starting the early 1990s until 1997, he self-syndicated five cartoons a week to over 40 newspapers in Mississippi on state subjects, also while contributing an exclusive cartoon to the Mississippi Business Journal once a week.

The Honolulu Star-Bulletin hired Jones to fill in for a year while their regular cartoonist, Corky Trinidad, took a year-long sabbatical. After leaving Honolulu, Jones was hired by The Free Lance-Star. In addition to drawing five cartoons a week for the paper, Jones also wrote a daily column and drew a weekly caption contest. Staff cutbacks eliminated Jones' job in August, 2012. He didn't cartoon again until October 2013 when he started working for his former employer on a freelance basis. In February 2014 he ended his business relationship with Creators syndicate to start his own syndication.

In August 2012, a cartoon of Clay's shared by actor George Takei received over 900 comments, over 56,000 likes and shared over 6,000 times.

Jones' work was nationally syndicated to over 400 newspapers by Creators Syndicate until he created his own syndicate, claytoonz.com. His work has been reprinted in USA Today, The New York Times, the Los Angeles Times, The Washington Post, Newsweek and Time. His work is archived at the Mitchell Memorial Library at Mississippi State University. In 1997, Pelican Publishing published a book of his work titled Knee-Deep In Mississippi, a collection of cartoons mostly covering that state. His work has been featured on CNN and MSNBC. Jones draws a weekly cartoon for the CNN Opinion newsletter.

A book of his work, entirely about the Donald Trump presidential administration, titled Tales from the Trumpster Fire was published by Mr. Media Books in 2019.

Jones is also a musician and was vocalist, guitar player and main songwriter for the alternative rock band Corporate T-shirt which released their only album, No Thanks To Hancock, in 2009.

On January 8, 2018, a cartoon of Jones' describing President Donald Trump as a national emergency was flashed on the San Francisco Federal Building while Trump was delivering an address from the Oval Office.

On May 17, 2021, Jones tweeted that he had been suspended from Facebook for an editorial cartoon editorializing the 2021 Israel–Palestine crisis in which his cartoon depicted Hamas carrying a sign stating, "Death to Israel!" and Benjamin Netanyahu carrying a sign stating, "Death to Palestine!", both with a trail of bloody footprints and the two were about to round the corner of a building into each other. Jones included an image of the cartoon, his appeal, and Facebook's ruling.

In June 2022, Jones was named the Curator for the Museum of Political Corruption’s Thomas Nast Gallery of Political Cartoons. Jones is slated to develop a political cartoon competition for the museum.

== Awards ==
Jones won first place for Best Editorial Cartoon in the Mississippi Press Association Better Newspaper Contest, For the first three years of the contests existence. He has also won awards in New York, Hawaii and Virginia, taking first and second place in 2011 in the Virginia Press Association's annual contest, and first place awards in 2012, 2013 and 2014.

In 2018, Jones won for Best Cartoon in the National Newspaper Association's Better Newspaper Contest for a cartoon he drew for The Highlands Current in Cold Spring, New York. In 2019, he was the finalist for the Herblock Award. In 2020, Jones took third place in the 2020 National Headliner Award for Editorial cartoons in the Print/Photo, Daily Newspapers and News Syndicates category.

Jones is the 2022 winner of the Robert F. Kennedy Journalism Award in Editorial Cartooning for both his self-syndicated editorial cartoons and his CNN editorial cartoons. They stated that his "unique style" is "energetic" that uses "image and text to comment on larger issues" and his cartoons hit on themes of human rights, imbalance of power and systemic racism.

On June 23, 2022, the Society of Professional Journalists awarded Jones the 2021/2022 Sigma Delta Chi Award for excellence in journalism for Editorial Cartooning (Newspaper Cir. 1-100,000 or Regional Magazine). In the awards presentation, the president stated, "Jones has a childlike style and a gut-punch of an opinion style. That contradiction makes his cartoons all the more powerful.

On September 13, 2025, the Association of American Editorial Cartoonists (AAEC) awarded Jones the Rex Babin Award for Local Cartooning.
