= Hammarlund =

American radio manufacturer (1910–73)

Hammarlund Manufacturing Co., Inc.
- Industry: Electronics
- Founded: 1910
- Founder: Oscar Hammarlund
- Defunct: 1973
- Fate: Dissolved
- Headquarters: Mars Hill, North Carolina, United States
- Products: radio equipment

The Hammarlund Manufacturing Company was founded by Oscar Hammarlund in New York City, New York, United States, in 1910. When the company was dissolved in 1973, it was among the United States' very oldest producers of radio equipment.

== History ==
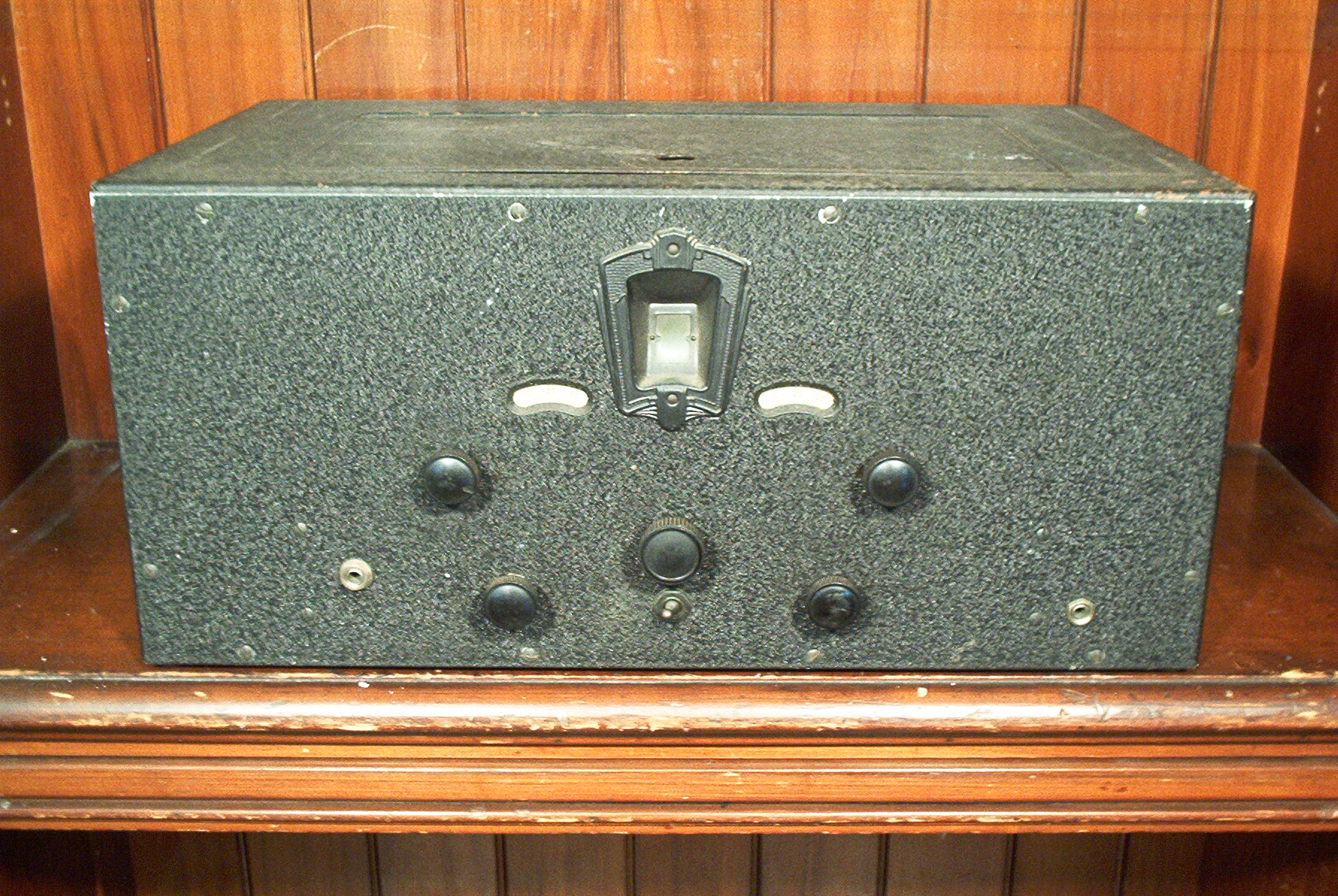
Hammarlund Comet Pro

The first Hammarlund plant was a loft operation engaged in radio component manufacturing on Fulton Street in Lower Manhattan, New York City. Their variable capacitor designs quickly became industry standards, and the component's schematic symbol was adopted as the company's logo. In the mid-1920s, Hammarlund formed a partnership called Hammarlund-Roberts Co. specifically to offer kits for AM broadcast radios using Hammarlund parts. The company opened its major manufacturing facility in Mars Hill, North Carolina in 1951.

=== Comet pro receiver ===
When Hammarlund-Roberts went out of business in 1931, Hammarlund Mfg. Co., Inc. entered into the shortwave receiver market with the introduction of the "Comet Pro", the first commercial short wave superheterodyne receiver. Professional listening post installations made great use of the Comet Pro, and it was used also on many major exploration expeditions.

=== Super pro receivers ===
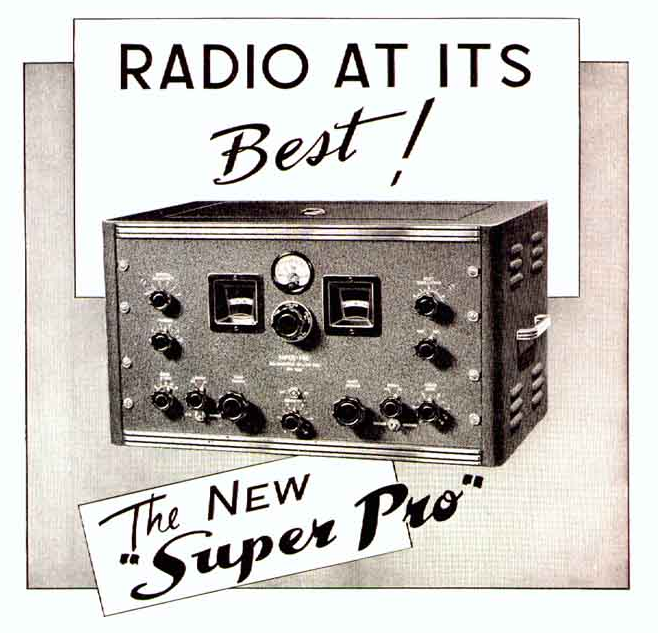
1939 ad for the SP-200 Super Pro

Following introduction of the Comet-Pro came an improved receiver, called the Super-Pro (the SP-200 series). The latter was put in production in 1936. Hammarlund expanded when World War II broke out. In addition to manufacturing Super-Pro receivers (Signal Corps model BC-779), Hammarlund variable capacitor production totaled 1 million a month. At the end of World War II, the market was flooded with surplus receivers, which may be a reason many working examples of this model are still found today.

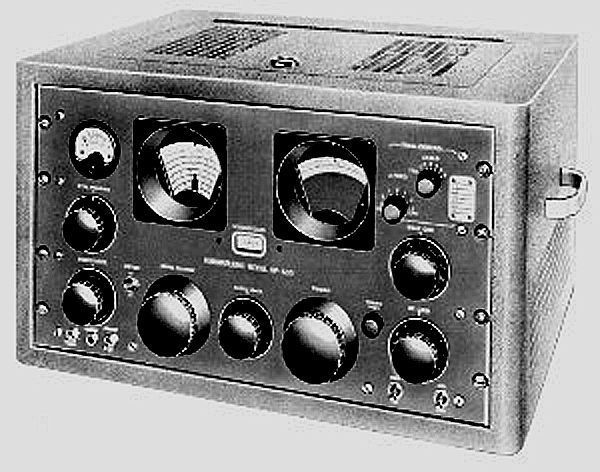
SP-600 Super Pro

In 1947 the SP-600 Super-Pro receiver, which surpassed the SP-200 in performance, was introduced, covering the frequency range of 540 kHz to 54 MHz with a 0–100 calibrated mechanical band spread. The SP-600 series were widely used throughout the world for military, laboratory and commercial application.

=== Communications gear ===
While Hammarlund was most famous for its amateur/short-wave receiver lines such as the Super Pro series and the HQ series (which includes the HQ-100, 110, 120, 129, 145, 150, 160, 170, 180, 200 and 215), a number of transmitters were also produced. These saw only limited use.

Hammarlund also built a substantial quantity of the VHF FM "Village Radios" for the United States Agency for International Development (AID) to use in Vietnam, as well as a number of land-mobile radios and transceivers for the Citizens band radio market.

=== Final decades ===
Even as the company continued to produce communications equipment for the amateur, commercial, and Citizens Band radio markets, it underwent frequent changes of ownership. The first was in the late 1950s when Hammarlund was sold to Telechrome. Several years later Telechrome sold out to Giannini Scientific. In the late 1960s, the company was once again sold to the Electronic Assistance Corporation (EAC). But, this sale was final. The product line was sold off in parts or phased out. The Cardwell Condenser Corporation purchased all remaining stocks, and in 1973 the Hammarlund factory closed. At the time of its dissolution, Hammarlund was among the USA's very oldest producers of radio equipment.

Today, many Hammarlund radios are collected, restored and used by vintage amateur radio enthusiasts.

== Hammarlund legend ==
There are a number of false etymologies regarding why amateur radio operators are colloquially called hams. Likely an example of corporate wishful thinking, one such tale is that Hammarlund products were supposedly so pre-eminent in the pioneering era of radio that they became a part of the language of radio. As the story goes, early radio enthusiasts affectionately called Hammarlund products "Ham" products, and called themselves "Ham" operators. In truth, Hammarlund was a minor and barely known company at the time "ham" started to be used.

== See also ==
- Collins radio
- E.F. Johnson
- Hallicrafters
- National radio
