= Eico =

EICO
- Type: Public
- Industry: Electronics
- Founded: 1945; 81 years ago in New York City, New York, U.S.
- Founder: Harry Ashley
- Defunct: 1999
- Headquarters: New York City, New York, U.S.
- Products: Electronic kits

EICO (an acronym for Electronic Instrument Company) was a manufacturer of electronics kits located in New York City, New York, United States.

== History ==
EICO was established in New York City in 1945 by radio repair business owner Harry Ashley to manufacture electronic test equipment in kit form. His first product, advertised in the July 1946 Radio News, was the model 113 VTVM/audible signal tracer. A wide variety of test equipment remained the company's mainstay during the time it was in the electronics business, however EICO often augmented their product lines with what was thought fashionable. For example, in the late 1940s it offered Geiger counters in response to public interest in uranium prospecting. Sales by December 1956 were said to be over one million instruments. Their largest secondary market was audio equipment. Starting in 1958, EICO produced amateur radio equipment often in kit form, such as the EICO 720 and 730 transmitters. Later in the 1960s they made the EICO 753 SSB transceiver for amateur radio use. Unfortunately problems with the 753--or seven drifty three-- damaged their reputation which led to their decline. They also sold specialty test equipment for the ham radio market, including signal generators and grid dip oscillators.

First located at 84 Withers Street in Brooklyn, New York, and later at 33-00 Northern Boulevard in Long Island City, EICO produced hi-fi products in the early 1950s to the mid-1960s with a line of tuners, preamplifiers, and amplifiers, available both in kit form or fully assembled. The model EICO HF-81 integrated tube amplifier is just one of several highly regarded products manufactured by EICO during this period. EICO is also known for "monoblock" amplifiers such as the HF-50 and HF-35, stereo integrated amplifiers such as the ST-40 and ST-70, as well as many other amplifiers and preamplifiers.

In the late 1960s, EICO introduced a line of solid state electronics audio equipment referred to as Cortina, but by the mid-1970s the only audio products they sold were kits manufactured for them in South Korea. EICO left the audio market in the late 1970s and the electronics market some time later. EICO existed as a property management company until 1999, when the company was liquidated at the request of the shareholders.

== Gallery ==
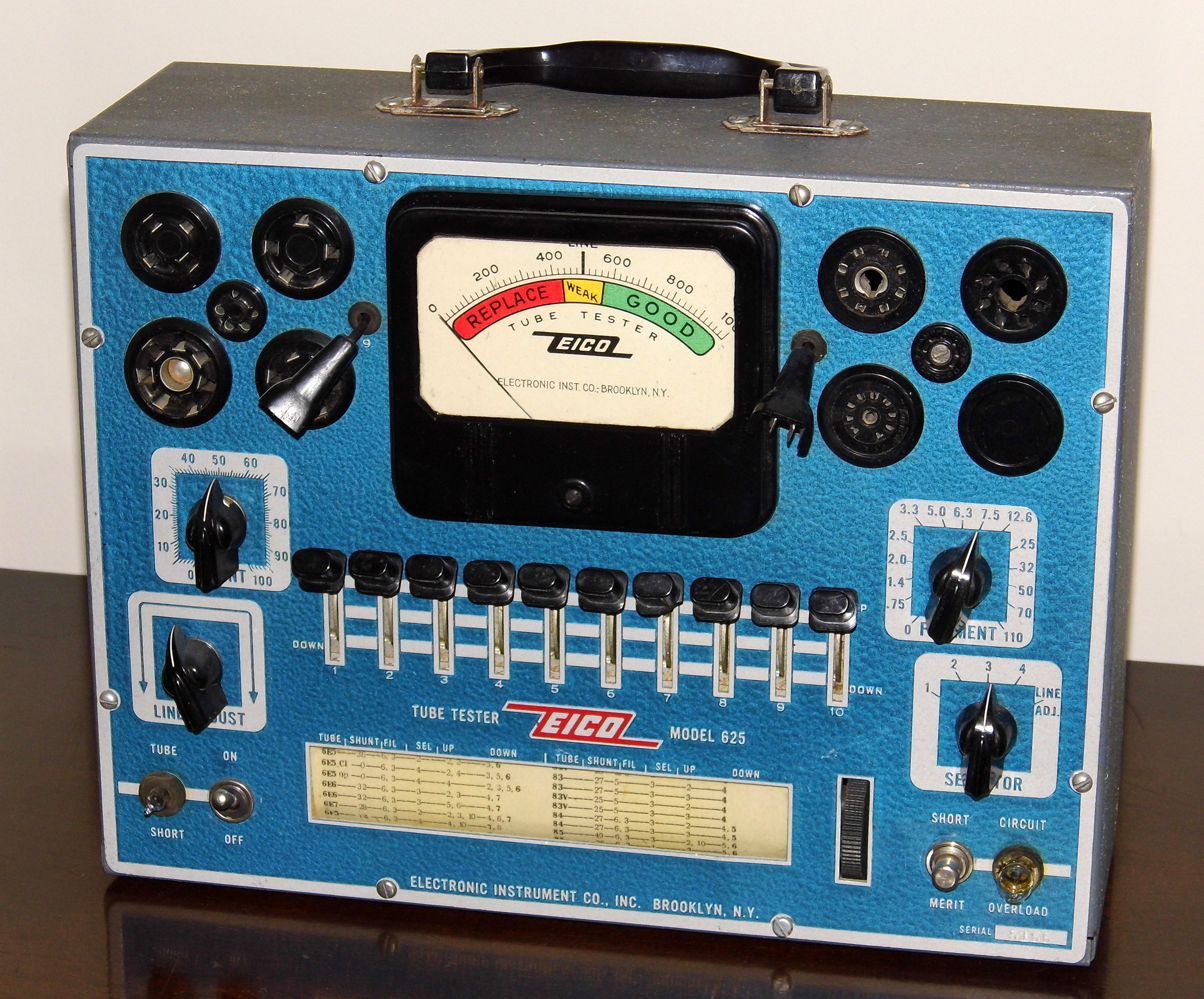
Electronic Tube Tester, Model 625, ca. 1951

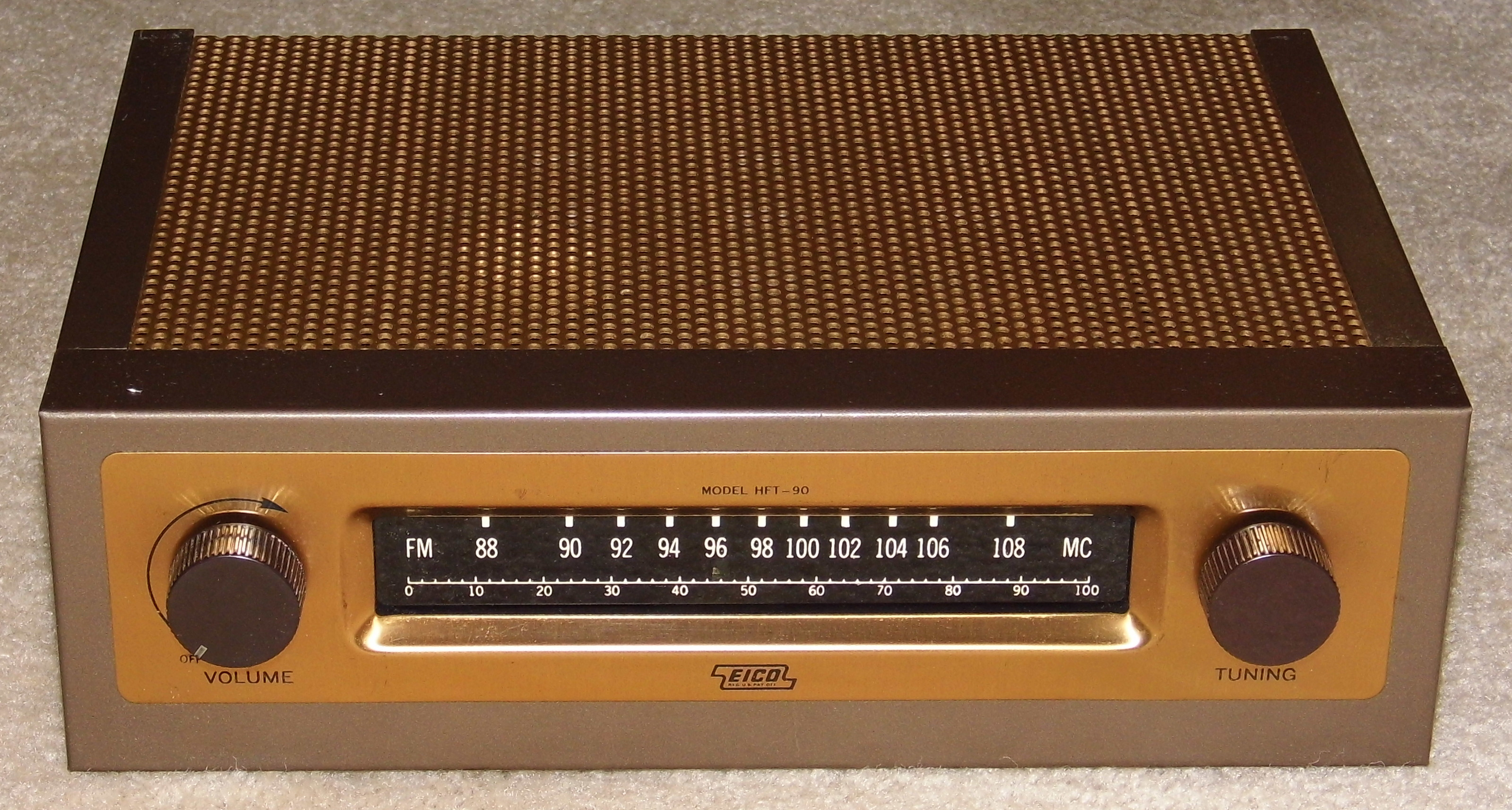
FM Mono Tuner, Model HFT-90, ca. 1959

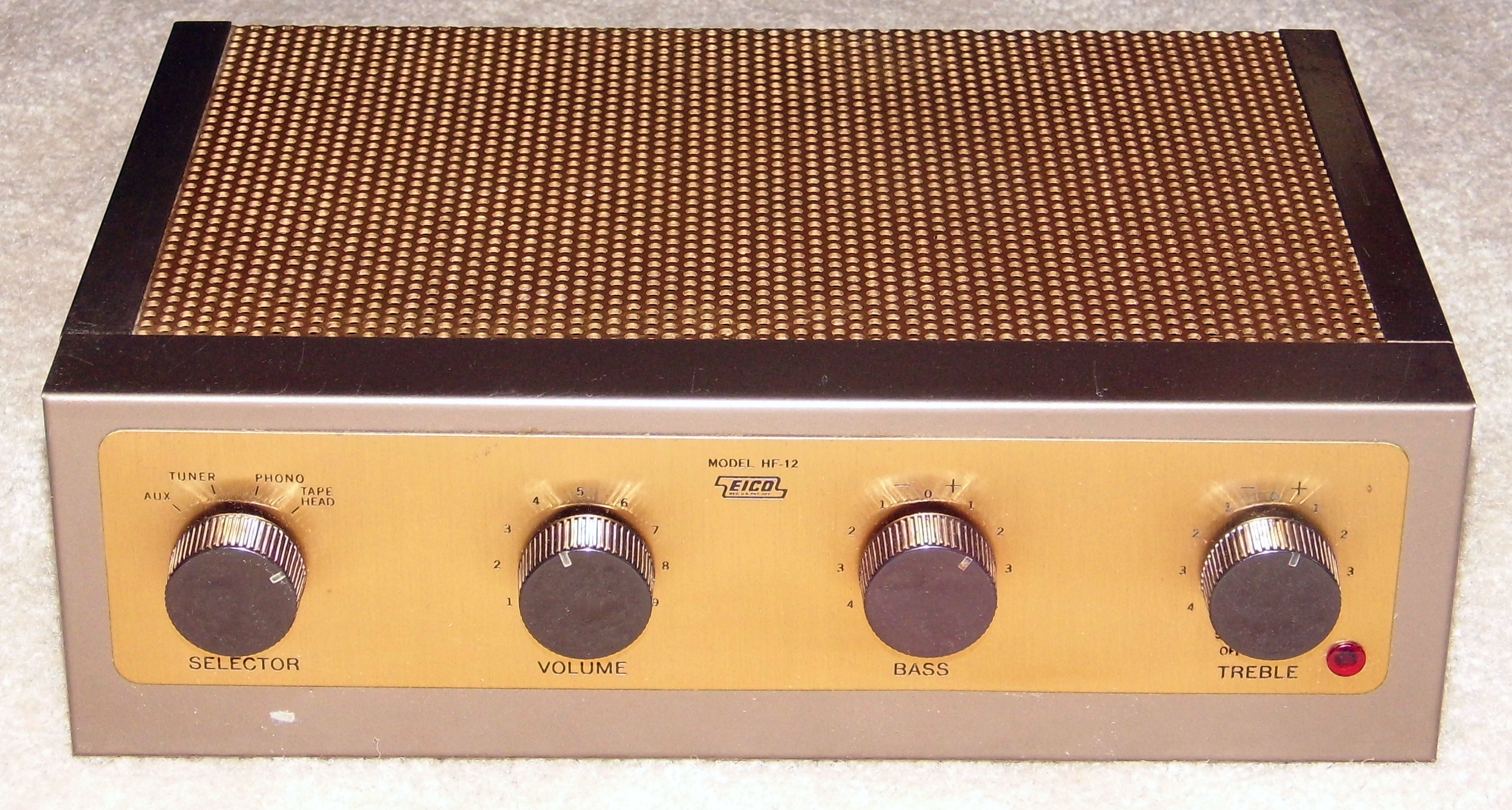
Audio Amplifier, Model HF-12, ca. 1959

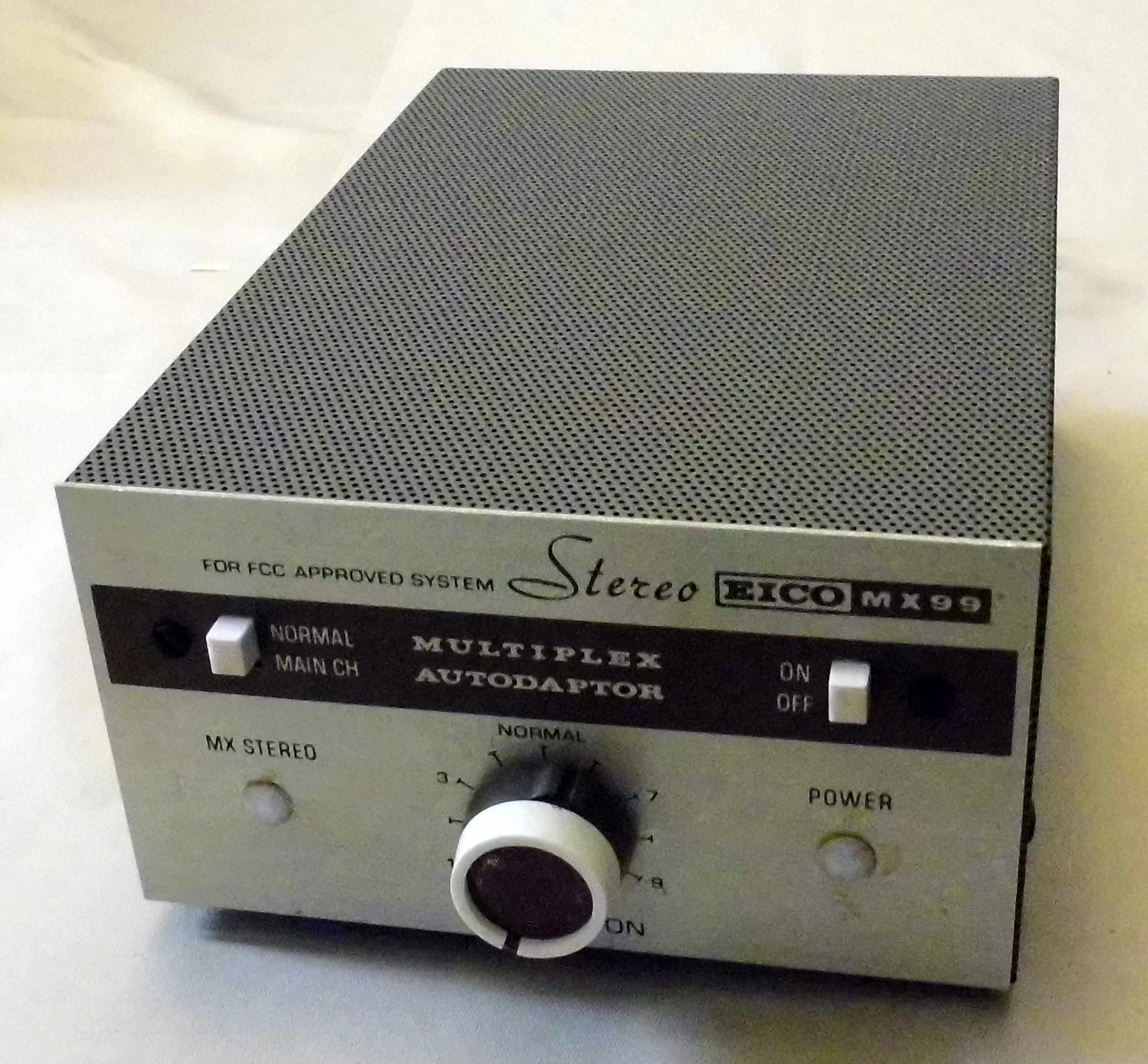
Stereo Multiplex Autodaptor, Model MX99, ca. 1961
