= MPT-1327 =

MPT 1327 is an open industry standard for trunked radio communications networks. Developed in the United Kingdom by the Department of Trade and Industry (DTI) and the Radiocommunications Agency (now part of Ofcom), it was first published in January 1988.

Because MPT 1327 was published as a non-proprietary standard, it was adopted globally by numerous equipment vendors and system operators throughout Europe, Australasia, South Africa, and parts of Asia and the Americas. While historically one of the most widely deployed analogue trunking protocols in public utility, commercial transport, and industrial sectors, MPT 1327 systems have increasingly been superseded by digital trunking standards, notably DMR Tier III, TETRA, and NXDN.

== Digital alternatives ==
The closest direct digital alternative to MPT1327 is NXDN as NXDN virtually replicates MPT1327 using dPMR (digital private mobile radio).

Many MPT1327 systems in the UK have been replaced with either Kenwood Communications' NXDN or Motorola Solutions' MOTOTRBO Capacity Plus systems.

The TETRA trunked radio standard was developed by the European Telecommunications Standards Institute (ETSI), as a digital alternative to analogue trunked systems. However, TETRA, with its enhanced encryption capability, has developed into a higher tier (public safety) product, currently mainly used by governments, some larger airports and government-owned utilities.

DMR (digital mobile radio), and dPMR (digital private mobile radio) are more recent ETSI-standards for digital mobile radio using two-slot time division multiple access (TDMA) and frequency-division multiple access (FDMA) respectively. The Tier 3 standard for these systems defines a trunking protocol very similar to MPT1327 and is intended as a potential migration path for existing and perhaps future trunking customers. Tier 3 equipment is (late 2011) now becoming available, so the impact on TETRA and MPT 1327 is yet to be seen, but may well be significant. However, it is unlikely that in terms of cost that the complicated new DMR/dPMR equipment will be able to compete with the simpler MPT1327 equipment for some time, if ever.

It is worth noting that whilst many comparisons are made between Digital and Analog radio technologies, when it comes to applying these arguments to MPT1327, many of the distinctions become blurred, since MPT1327 with its digital control channel, already offers most of the features being offered by the DMR/dPMR/TETRA counterparts.

Furthermore, most MPT1327 systems are engineered to a far higher standard than conventional FM systems, partially due to the lack of CTCSS within the standard. As such arguments with regards to "noisy FM audio quality", can become misleading, since the squelch levels tend to be set rather high on MPT1327 systems, such that weak/noisy signals do not generally open the mute.

== MPT1327 advantages and features ==
The advantage of MPT 1327 over TETRA is the increased availability, lower cost of equipment, the ease of installation, the familiarity with the equipment, and many believe that MPT 1327 is superior to TETRA, due to its uncompressed FM audio, and greater receiver sensitivity. MPT1327 control channel signalling is more resilient, since the TETRA protocol uses a complex modulation scheme that requires a far higher Signal to Noise ratio to function than 1,200 bit/s FFSK signalling.

Systems based on MPT 1327 only require one, but usually use two or more radio channels per site. Channels can be 12.5 or 25 kHz bandwidth, and can be any variety of channel spacings, with 6.25 kHz or 12.5 kHz being typical. At least one of these channels is defined as the control channel (CCH) and all other channels are traffic channels (TCs) used for speech calls.

A typical installation will have around 6–10 channels. A 7-channel trunk, correctly engineered, is capable of handling in excess of 3,000 mobile units. The capacity of the system increases dramatically with the number of traffic channels. For example, 1 traffic channel with queuing can not handle many customers, perhaps 2 minicabs with 20 mobiles. In effect this would be a CBS with queuing. However, a 7 channel trunked system can handle 40 minicabs with 20 mobiles with ease. The Erlang formulas are typically used for calculating system capacity.

=== Spectrum efficiency ===
Whilst MPT 1327 systems, unlike DMR or dPMR, do not employ digital speech compression to gain any Spectral Efficiency (voice channels per 6.25 kHz), there are several methods used that increase the Spectrum Efficiency (Erlangs per square kilometre, per 6.25 kHz).

A spectrum efficiency advantage over a 4-slot TDMA system like TETRA is in areas where low-bandwidth channels are required. The absolute minimum TETRA installation would require a 25 kHz bandwidth in order to carry a control slot and three traffic slots. The absolute minimum MPT1327 assignment is a single non-dedicated control channel, utilising 12.5 kHz, in most cases.

A non-dedicated control channel can be used as a traffic channel when all the other traffic channels are busy. This can be useful if the site is part of a multi-site network and has a very low traffic profile as the site could have a single channel rather than at least two freeing up one channel for use elsewhere. The disadvantage is loss of queuing, and data cannot be sent on the control channel whilst it is in traffic mode. A non-dedicated CCH should not be used as a "reserve tank" for a busy site as the lack of signalling will seriously affect the operation of the site.

==== Time-shared control channels and channel pooling ====
Some MPT 1327 networks can also time-share control channels, which can be useful if the network has limited frequency availability, as it frees up channels for use as traffic channels, which can also be pooled across sites so the network capacity follows the traffic. This is another advantage of MPT 1327 (and dPMR) over TDMA-based systems such as TETRA and DMR, which cannot pool traffic channels so efficiently (if at all). The disadvantage of using a time-shared CCH is that it slows down registration and calls and requires some customization of the registration process, so is only useful if the network has a patient user community!

=== Speech and data ===
Speech is sent as narrowband frequency modulation. Data messages between mobiles and the network are exchanged on the control channel at 1,200 bits per second using FFSK signalling, or a specific "modem call", known as "non-prescribed data" can be established, whereby free-form 1,200 baud data can be exchanged on a traffic channel without tying up the control channel. With the use of special modems, the speed can be 19,200 bit/s. This, along with Short Data Messaging and Status Messaging via the control channel makes an MPT1327 network ideal for managing AVL for asset management, meter reading and SCADA networks, the advantage being that the network can be used for this sort of application whilst still carrying voice traffic.

=== Numbering and addressing ===
Each subscriber in an MPT-1327 trunked radio network has a unique call number. This call number (address) is a compound number consisting of a prefix (three digits), the fleet number and the subscriber's call number within the fleet. Different numbering schemes work differently, for example Zetron uses the first two digits of the Ident as the fleet number, and the last two digits as the unit number. Idents in the 6,000–6,999 range are typically used to establish group calls. After it has been entered the call number will be converted in the mobile to a 20-bit address. The numbering rules are clarified and expanded by supplementary standards such as MPT-1343.

For the duration of his call a subscriber is exclusively allocated a traffic channel from the available pool. If all channels are occupied, the call will be queued. If the control channel has become a traffic channel, like in the case of a non-dedicated control channel, the call will be queued in the radio, although radio queuing loses the first come, first served effect, so if there are seven units queuing, the last unit to queue may get a traffic channel first.

== The different types of communications on an MPT-1327 network and their definitions ==
=== Traffic types ===
- Mobile-mobile in a cell
- Mobile-mobile in different cells
- Mobile-line access unit via landline or radio
- Mobile-dispatcher station via landline or radio
- Mobile-PABX, Mobile-PSTN

=== Data communication ===
- Status messages on the control channel (5-bit data length)
- Short data messages on the control channel (186-bit data length)
- Transparent data transmission on the TC (data communication).

=== Calls ===
- Point to point connections
- Group calls with talk entitlement
- Group calls without talk entitlement (broadcast calls)

Broadcast calls can be used to make announcements to the entire customer base on a trunked system. For example, if work is to be carried out on the trunked system, the owner of the system can initiate a Broadcast Call which calls every mobile on the system. However, the mobiles may not have talk entitlement, so the PTT may not work. By this means the owner can announce to all customers a short period of inoperation due to maintenance.

== Regional variants ==
While MPT 1327 defines the core radio signalling protocol, several regional variants and numbering formats emerged internationally:

- MPT 1343 - The standard UK and pan-European commercial numbering scheme.
- Chekker (Regionet 43) - Operated extensively across Germany and parts of Central Europe by Deutsche Telekom.
- 3RP (CNET 2424) - Adopted for private and public-access mobile radio networks in France.
- Multiax - Deployed in Australia and New Zealand.
- Gong An - A localized implementation deployed for public security and transport organizations in China.

== See also ==
- Trunked radio system
- Digital mobile radio
- TETRA
