= Aratani =

Aratani (written: 荒谷) is a Japanese surname. Notable people with the surname include:

- George Aratani (1917–2013), Japanese American businessman
- Hiroki Aratani (荒谷 弘樹, born 1975), Japanese football player
- Shunji Aratani (荒谷 俊治, born 1930), conductor of the Nagoya Philharmonic Orchestra (1974–1980)
