= Kirisun =

Chinese telecommunications equipment company

Kirisun Communication Co., Ltd.
- Trade name: Kirisun
- Native name: 科立讯
- Romanized name: Kělìxùn
- Formerly: Quanzhou Baotong Electronics Co., Ltd.
- Type: Private
- Industry: Telecommunications equipment
- Incorporated: China
- Founded: 1986 (origins); 2001; 25 years ago (as Kirisun)
- Headquarters: Shenzhen, Guangdong, Shenzhen, China
- Area served: Worldwide
- Products: Two-way radios, DMR conventional and trunking systems, Push-to-Talk over Cellular (PoC), analog transceivers, dispatch systems
- Production output: Approx. 1.2 million units annually
- Brands: Kirisun
- Services: Professional mobile radio network engineering, OEM/ODM
- Subsidiaries: Fujian Kirisun Communications Co., Ltd. Kirisun UK; Kirisun Americas
- Website: www.kirisun.com

Kirisun Communication Co., Ltd. (Chinese: 科立讯通信有限公司; pinyin: Kělìxùn Tōngxìn Yǒuxiàn Gōngsī), formerly operating as Kirisun Electronics (Shenzhen) Co., Ltd., is a Chinese designer and manufacturer of telecommunications equipment and professional wireless communications solutions. The company specializes in two-way radios (walkie-talkies), digital mobile radio (DMR) infrastructure, and Push-to-Talk over Cellular (PoC) platforms.

Founded in its modern corporate form in 2001, Kirisun has grown into a major supplier in the global private mobile radio (PMR) market, providing communications equipment to commercial enterprises, utilities, and governmental bodies in dozens of countries.

The company is an active member of the DMR Association.

== History ==
The roots of the company date back to 1986 in Quanzhou, Fujian, initially operating in radio electronics and later known as Quanzhou Baotong Electronics Co., Ltd. In 2001, the company established Kirisun Electronics (Shenzhen) Co., Ltd. in Shenzhen to expand research, development, and international marketing operations.

Throughout the 2000s, Kirisun expanded into export markets, securing European Declaration of conformity (CE) and Federal Communications Commission (FCC) certifications for its self-developed transceivers. In 2008, the company opened a specialized manufacturing facility in Quanzhou, recognized as one of the earliest dedicated manufacturing bases in China for professional cordless radio transceivers.

The company has received several municipal and industry awards for export development and technical design, and has served as an official radio equipment supplier for major events in China, including the 2010 Shanghai World Expo.

== Operations ==
Kirisun is headquartered in the Nanshan District of Shenzhen, Guangdong, which houses primary executive and R&D operations. The company operates research facilities in Shenzhen, Guangzhou, and Quanzhou, as well as an international technical and distribution support presence in the United Kingdom and the United States.

The company's primary manufacturing facility in Quanzhou spans over 20,000 square meters and has an estimated annual capacity of approximately 1.2 million terminals.

=== International ===
Kirisun distributes its products across more than 55 countries worldwide. Its customer base includes commercial logistics firms, transportation operators, utility providers, and public safety agencies. Notable institutional users have included government agencies in India, Turkey, Philippines as well as the Bangladesh Navy.
