= PDT Standard =

Radio standard in China

PDT (short for Professional Digital Trunking or Police Digital Trunking) is an open industry standard for trunked radio system in China servicing police wireless communications and professional mobile radio. The standard is being maintained by the Professional Digital Trunking System Industry Association, an association of major vendors of wireless communications equipment in China. The association was formed with the help from Information and Communications Bureau of the Ministry of Public Security. The standard was used to facilitate the digital transformation of the Ministry's existing MPT analogue trunking system. Government policy supporting this domestic standard had led to the abolishment of previous GA/T industry standards based on the European TETRA standard.

The initial major contributor of the standard were Hytera Communications and Vigor Communications(WANGE). Vigor was also the first enterprise to produce PDT two-way radio products.

== Features ==
PDT features an all-IP architecture with independent control and carrier, independent call processing and service switching. It is based on the universal SNMP network management standard. It supports various networking modes and is highly scalable. It uses a distributed system architecture and a multi-layered fault mitigation design for high reliability and efficiency. Hardware platforms are built with universal devices such as switches and routers, based on mature technologies and low costs. It uses a module-based design and supports customizable system functions. The core network is interoperable with different systems such as DMR (Digital Mobile Radio) and Tetra (Terrestrial Trunked Radio).
