= Ambitalk =

Radio system

Ambitalk is a Trunked radio system operating in the VHF-Low frequency range. It allows users to make private or "group" voice calls between vehicle based mobile units within its coverage area.

Ambitalk is owned by Maxxwave Ltd and operates using a propitiatory signalling system based upon MPT1327, but with digitally processed voice.

== History ==
The concept of Public Access radio networks is not new, with many networks such as GEC National One and Band Three Radio being launched in the UK in the 1980s. These closed around 2003 when Dolphin Telecom entered administration for the final time.

Throughout the period of the 1980s to 2003 there had always existed smaller "regional" radio networks within the UK, with several of the larger networks operating a number of interconnected "regional" networks that formed a quasi-National operation. Wavelength and Fleetcomm, both now defunct are examples of these.

Ambitalk is a reincarnation of the Maxxwave regional network originally covering Rugby, Coventry and Warwick in the Midlands and later adding additional transmitter stations to cover areas of London and Birmingham.

Around 2013 this regional radio network, previously powered by Zetron and Fylde MPT1327 controllers on Band III was redeveloped, with custom controllers designed by Maxxwave and was redeployed to lower frequency bands.

== Current state ==
From 2013 onwards Ambitalk expanded, obtaining low cost national spectrum (due to the unpopular low frequency bands) and installing additional transmitter sites around the country.

Ambitalk has installed microwave links and battery backup to each transmitter site.

== Recognition ==
The UK Government has commissioned a UK Spectrum Usage and Demand report through the UK Spectrum Policy Forum (run by Department for Culture, Media and Sport). This report looks at all major communications solutions available across the UK and notes that a significant number of two way radio users in the UK are now using Ambitalk as their preferred communications platform.

In 2015, Ambitalk was awardedthe FCS Gerald David OBE award for Innovation in Business Radio. This award is given by the FCS, the UK communications trade body.

In February 2016 Maxxwave was presented the "International Critical Communications TETRA Award" for "Excellence in Radio Sites and Services". This was presented by Adrian Scrase, CTO of ETSI.

In July 2016, Ambitalk received two "Comms Business Awards" for "Market Maker - Mobile" and "Ones to Watch".

== Low frequency bands ==
Contrary to current trends, Ambitalk uses lower frequency bands than competing technologies.

Higher frequency bands are preferred for rolling out wireless communications systems due to the lack of interference from atmospheric disturbances, smaller antennas and more manageable coverage characteristics, vital when planning a Cellular network

Low frequencies on the other hand are traditionally plagued by electronic interference from numerous sources and are prone to being unusable for weeks on end during summer months due to interference from foreign transmitters due to Sporadic E propagation thereby giving poor quality signals.

Ambitalk addresses this interference by developing a Smart antenna array for low frequency bands. Such systems are normally only deployed in far higher frequency bands and the use of such a system in a low frequency band is somewhat unusual.
