= Kenwood Corporation =

Japanese electronics company

- Logo used since 2011
- Native name: 株式会社ケンウッド
- Romanized name: Kabushiki gaisha Ken'uddo
- Formerly: Kasuga Radio Co., Ltd. (1946–1960); Trio Corporation (1960–1986)
- Type: Privately held company (1946–1961); Public company (1961–2008); Subsidiary (2008–2011); Brand (2011–present)
- Industry: Electronics
- Founded: 21 December 1946; 79 years ago in Komagane City, Nagano Prefecture, Japan
- Defunct: 1 October 2008; 18 years ago (original company) (Note: The original company was absorbed into JVCKenwood, although some products made by the company still use the Kenwood brand.); 1 October 2011; 15 years ago (subsidiary of JVCKenwood)
- Fate: Merged with Victor Company of Japan, Ltd. (2008); Subsidiary absorbed into JVCKenwood (2011)
- Successor: JVCKenwood
- Headquarters: Hachiōji, Tokyo, Japan
- Key people: Shoichiro Eguchi (CEO)
- Products: Consumer electronics
- Revenue: ▼US$1.71 billion (2014)
- Operating income: ▼US$20.51 million (2014)
- Net income: ▼US$15.2 billion (2024)
- Number of employees: 17,623 (2025)
- Parent: JVCKenwood (2008–present)
- Website: www.kenwood.com

Kenwood Corporation (株式会社ケンウッド, Kabushiki gaisha Ken'uddo), brand stylized KENWOOD, was a Japanese consumer electronics company that was active independently from 1946 until 2008, and is since then a trademark brand name owned by JVCKenwood after Kenwood merged with JVC. The company was best known for its in-car audio products during the 1990s and 2000s with its main rival being Pioneer. Other than these, Kenwood has been known for audio equipment including AM/FM stereo receivers, cassette tape decks/recorders, amateur radio (ham radio) equipment, radios, televisions, and speakers.

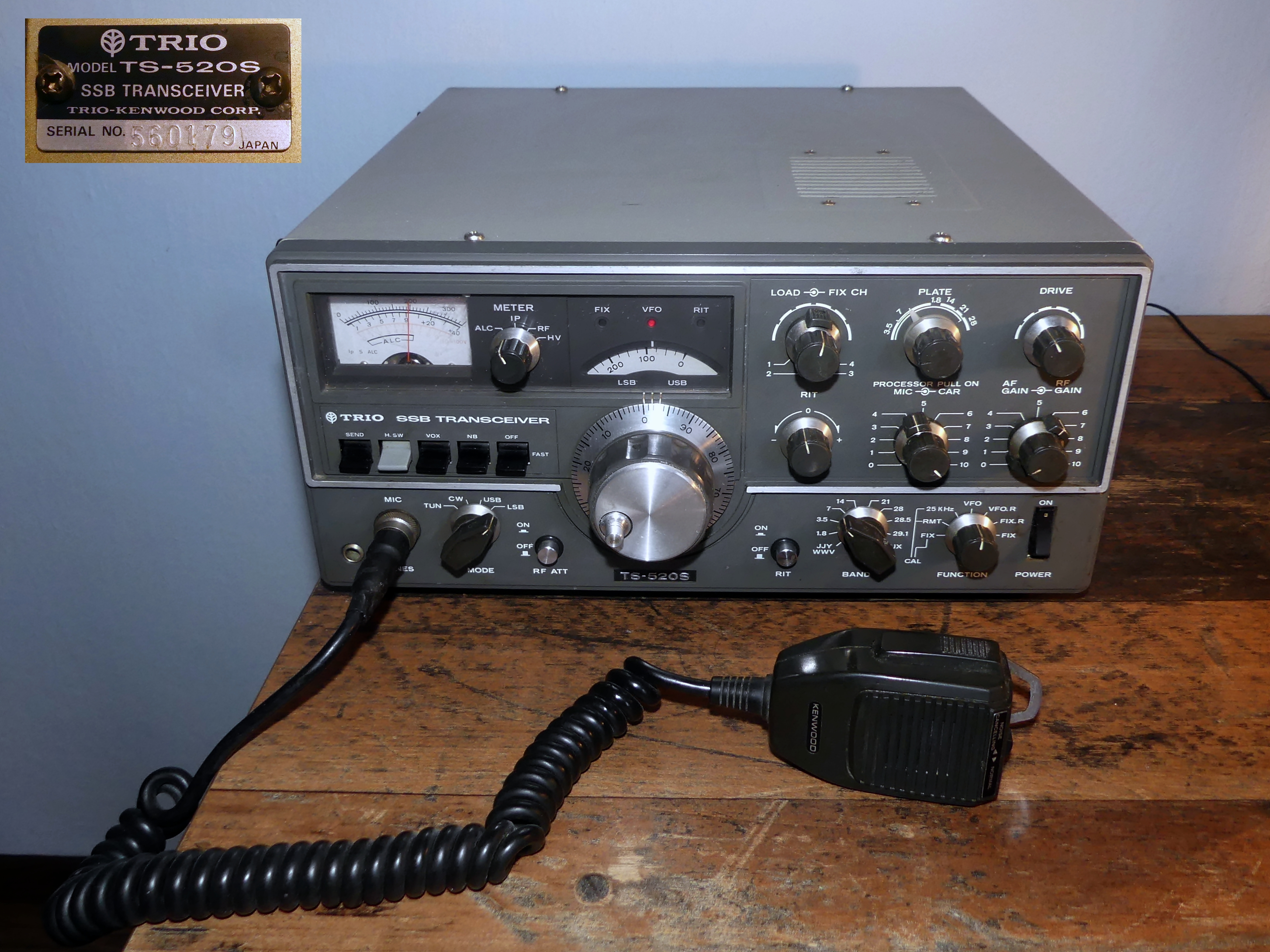
TRIO TS-520S, HF transceiver, manufactured in the 1970s and 1980s by the Trio-Kenwood Corporation

== History ==
Kenwood was established on 21 December 1946 as the Kasuga Radio Co. Ltd. in Komagane, Nagano Prefecture, Japan. In 1960, the company was renamed Trio Corporation. After that, the company established its first overseas office in 1963, in Los Angeles County, California, United States.

During the early 1960s, Trio's products were rebranded and sold by the Lafayette Radio Company, which focused on citizens band (CB) radio.

A&A Trading Co. imported Japanese-made electronics for RadioShack. William "Bill" Kasuga, a bilingual Japanese-speaking manager at A&A, partnered with George Aratani and Yoichi Nakase to establish a company as the exclusive importer of Trio products.

The name "Kenwood" was invented by Kasuga as a combination of "Ken" (a name common to Japan and North America that was, at the time, considered acceptable to American consumers due to the Kenmore appliance brand) and "Wood" (referring to the material, as well as suggesting a relation to Hollywood, California). Kenwood became more widely recognized than Trio, leading to the company's rebranding. In 1986, Trio acquired Kenwood and subsequently rebranded as the Kenwood Corporation. George Aratani was the first chairman of Kenwood USA Corporation and was later replaced by Kasuga. In October 2008, Kenwood merged with JVC to form a new holding company, JVCKenwood.

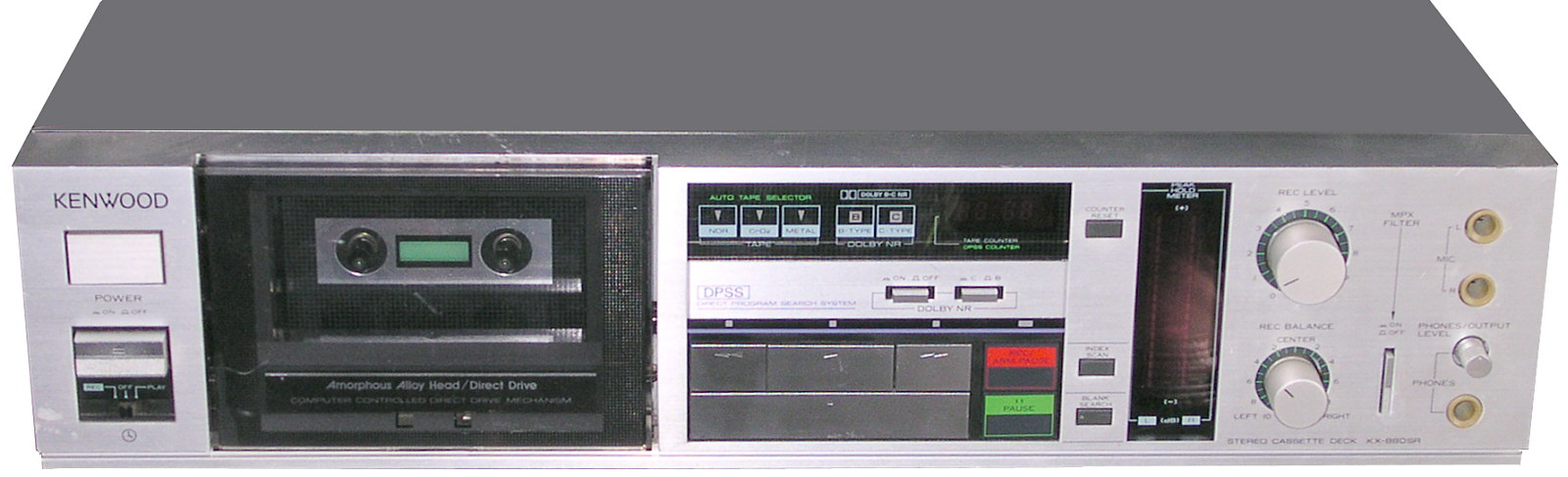
KX880SR audio cassette tape deck/recorder

Kenwood introduced its Sovereign line of components in 2001. In 2007, it discontinued its line of consumer audio receivers, home theatre systems, and other home electronics.

=== Company timeline ===
- 1949: High-frequency transformer passes the NHK (Japan Broadcasting Corporation) approval certificate for the first time in Japan.
- 1955: Established in Tokyo and begins mass production of audio, communications, and measuring equipment.
- 1958: The company's first amateur radio goes on sale.
- 1960: Renamed Trio Electronics, Inc.
- 1962: Launches the industry's first transistor amplifier.
- 1963: Sets up in the U.S. and begins full-scale overseas operations.
- 1966: Introduced fully transistorized audio products for the first time in the industry.
- 1969: The Trio Electronics (renamed to Kenwood in 1996) TR-7100, 144 MHz amateur radio car transceiver goes on sale.
- 1978: Introduced its first professional analogue two-way radios.
- 1979: Establishes the company's first overseas production unit in Singapore.
- 1983: Enters the U.S. land mobile radio market.
- 1986: Renamed Kenwood (formerly named Trio Electronics, Inc.).
- 1991: Enters the European licensed PMR (Private Mobile Radio) market. Begins selling license-free transceivers. Signs an official supply contract with McLaren to provide wireless radio equipment for the F1 championship.
- 1995: The Mir space station carries Kenwood's amateur wireless equipment.
  TK-250 launched— Kenwood's first purpose-designed PMR range for Europe.
- 1996: Changes the subsidiary name from Trio-Kenwood to Kenwood, coinciding with the company's 50th anniversary.
- 1997: Becomes Japan's first manufacturer to launch car-mounted DAB receivers.
- 1999: Jointly develops the world's first mobile digital broadcast receiving system.
  Introduces Pro-Talk PMR446 license-free two-way radio.
- 2001: Kenwood releases its first digital transceiver operating on P25.
- 2002: Develops a network interface module (NIM) for digital broadcasts via a communications satellite (CS).
- 2005: Forms a technical and capital alliance with Icom to jointly research the standardization of technical specifications for digital wireless radio equipment (NXDN).
  Kenwood Nagano Corp. acquires certification to "ISO/TS 16949", the international standard for quality management specific to the automotive industry.
- 2007: Kenwood announces the 144/430 (440) MHz FM Dual bander TM-V71 series.
  Announcement of completion of acquisition of the U.S. systems-based communication company Zetron, Inc.
  Invested ¥20.0 billion and formed a strategic business alliance with Victor Company of Japan, Limited.
- 2008: Notice of establishment of JVC Kenwood Holdings Inc.
- 2010: Introduces its first ATEX certified analogue two-way radio.
- 2011: Introduces NEXEDGE OTAP (Over The Air Programming)
  At the same time, JVC KENWOOD Holdings, Inc. changed its name to JVCKENWOOD Corporation. JVCKENWOOD Corporation completed an absorption of its three subsidiaries, Victor Company of Japan, Limited, Kenwood Corporation, and J&K Car Electronics Corporation.
- 2013: Kenwood announces launch of the TS-990S amateur radio base station.
  Global launch of NEXEDGE ETSI certified DPMR digital two-way radios.
- 2014: Acquires E.F. Johnson Technologies Inc.
- 2015: Launch of NX-5000 Series multi-protocol (NXDN/DMR/P25)-capable hand-portable and mobile radios.
- 2016: Launches TH-D74E VHF/UHF dual-band handheld amateur radio with built-in GPS.
- 2016: Launches ProTalk WD-K10 Series DECT (Digital Enhanced Cordless Telecommunications) Intercom systems.
- 2017: Launch of mid-tier NX-3000 Series multi-protocol (NXDN/DMR)-capable hand-portable and mobile radios.
- 2017: Radio Activity S.r.l., a developer of digital multi-frequency, simulcast and trunked radio relay systems compliant with Digital mobile radio (DMR) standards.
- 2018: Launch of high-specification, dual-PTT ProTalk TK-3601D hand-portable DPMR 446 radio.
- 2018: JVCKENWOOD acquires a minority share and announces a capital and business alliance with Tait International Ltd., a specialist in critical LMR and LTE communications.
- 2018: Dorna Sports announce a three-year contract with JVCKenwood as the radio communications sponsor of MotoGP™.
- 2019: Implementation of the world's first scalable, single site, 64-Channel, NXDN trunked communications system at the new Istanbul Airport, planned to become the world's largest upon completion of its development phases in 2025.
- 2019: Launch of heavy-duty, dual-PTT ProTalk TK-3701D hand-portable digital DPMR 446 radio.
- 2019: Launch of low-tier FM analogue plus digital DMR/NXDN-capable NX-1000 Series radios.
- 2022: JVCKENWOOD moves from the First Section of the Tokyo Stock Exchange to the Prime Market due to a revision of the Tokyo Stock Exchange's market classification.
- 2023: Launch of TH-D75 dual-band (144/430 MHz) digital handheld transceiver with D-STAR support, Bluetooth, GPS, and USB-C connectivity.
- 2024: Launch of NX-3320 multi-protocol digital portable radio supporting NXDN, DMR, and P25, with a full keypad, GPS, and IP67-rated rugged design.

== Products ==
=== Speakers ===
Kenwood produces a variety of audio speakers of different grades, ranging from stage sound to high-fidelity.

X series
Amplifier Tech-Spec	Maximum Output Power	RMS Power at 4 ohms	RMS Power at 2 ohms	Bridged at 4 ohms	Frequency Response	High Pass Filter	Low Pass Filter	Speaker Level Input	Signal to Noise Ratio	Dimensions W × D × H (mm)
XH901-5	1800 W	60 W × 4 ch + 400 W	75 W × 4 ch + 600 W	150 W x 2 ch + 400 W	20 Hz – 50 kHz	50 Hz – 200 Hz, -12 dB/oct	50 Hz – 200 Hz, -24 dB/oct	Yes	100 dB	260 × 169 × 51
XH401-4	800 W	75 W × 4 ch	100 W x 4 ch	200 W x 2 ch	20 Hz – 50 kHz	50 Hz – 200 Hz, -12 dB/oct (Low Range) 2.5 kHz – 10 kHz, -12 dB/oct (High Range)	50 Hz – 200 Hz, -12 dB/oct (Low Range) 2.5 kHz – 10 kHz, -12 dB/oct (High Range)	Yes	100 dB	220 × 169 × 35

The company introduced the first car stereo speaker to use a honeycombed linear plane diaphragm.

=== Amateur radio transceivers ===
Kenwood has offered lines of HF, VHF/UHF, and portable amateur radio models, including some with built-in digital data modes (Automatic Packet Reporting System, built on AX.25 packet radio) and modems needed to send and receive these protocols.

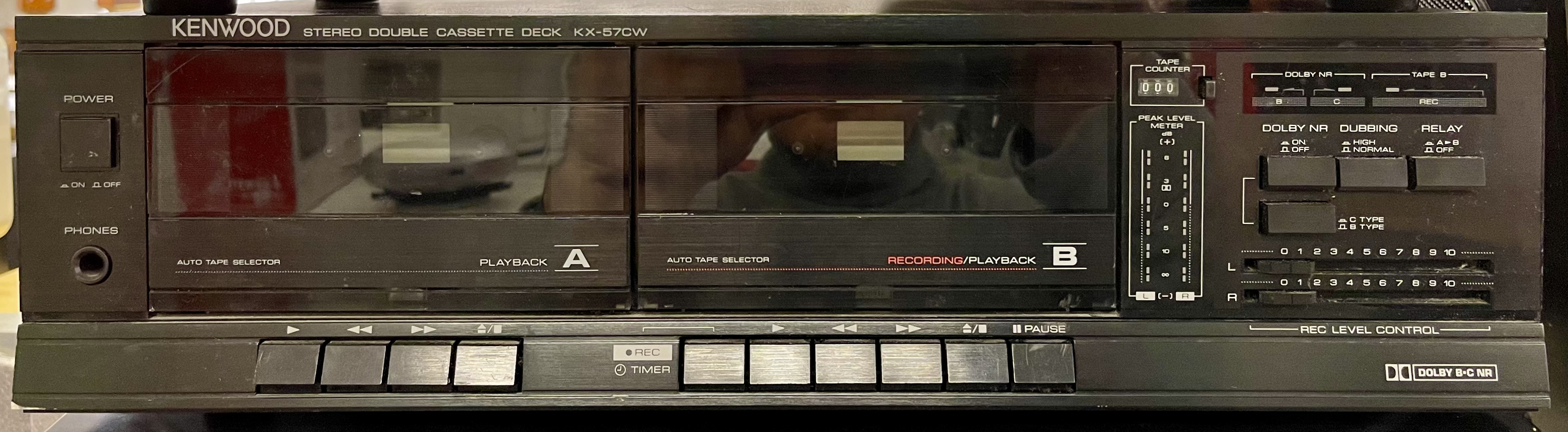
Kenwood KX-57CW

=== KA Series hi-fi systems ===
Kenwood launched a series of "Integrated Amplifier" stereo power amplifiers in 1977 and continued their production through the mid-1980s. The design for most of these products featured a true dual-mono path for stereo output (where no electrical components are shared between left- and right-channel amplification). Front plates were typically made in brushed aluminium with aluminium knobs and switches, glass covers, and in some cases analog VU meters.

Amplifiers in this series included (in no particular order):

- KA-1000 (11/1980)
- TRIO Supreme 1
- KA-2000
- KA-2002 (09/1970)
- KA-2200 (10/1982)
- KA-3100
- KA-6100 (1977)
- KA-7002 (1971)
- KA-7100 (10/1976)
- KA-7300 (10/1975)
- KA-8100 / KA-8150 (06/1977)
- KA-8300 (with analog meters vs. 8100)
- KA-9100
- KA-900 (11/1980)
- KA-907 / KA-9900 (10/1978)
- KA-9100 / KA-9150 (1977)
- KA-6100 (09/1978)

=== NV-Series Compact HiFi Systems ===
The Kenwood NV-301 and NV-701 series were released in 2000.

=== Communications equipment ===
Kenwood has produced two-way radios for a variety of communications standards, including wireless DECT intercom systems, the radio frequency PMR446 and its digital counterpart DPMR446, DPMR, the Project 25 standards suite, DMR and NXDN. Their communications product range includes hand-portable and mobile terminals (including Intrinsically Safe, ATEX- and IECEx-certified hand-portable radios), repeaters, infrastructure, and application solutions.
