= Tait Communications =

New Zealand radio communications company

- Type: Trust Structure
- Industry: Technology
- Founded: 1969
- Headquarters: Christchurch, New Zealand
- Area served: Worldwide
- Key people: Yoram Benit
- Products: Two-way radios Network Systems; Public Safety solutions Utility solutions Urban Transport solutions
- Number of employees: 869 (Worldwide 2011)
- Website: Tait Communications

Tait Communications is a New Zealand radio communications company founded in 1969 by Sir Angus Tait. The company has offices in 17 countries and employs 869 staff (2011). Tait develops voice and data radio technologies, exporting about 95% of products from its Christchurch manufacturing base. Customers include the New Zealand Police, London Buses, Country Fire Authority and Basin Electric Power Cooperative. Competitors include Motorola, Harris Corporation, E.F. Johnson Company, Raytheon, HYT, Selex and EMC spa.

== History ==
Tait Limited (trading as Tait Communications and formerly known as Tait Electronics Ltd) was founded in 1969 by New Zealand electronics innovator and businessman Sir Angus Tait, KNZM, OBE. The company's founding staff of 12 radio technologists produced the first generation of all-transistor mobile radios in New Zealand.

- In 1973, Tait released the Mini-phone series of mobile radios, which were adopted as the industry standard in New Zealand.
- In 1979, Tait launched a range of portable radios and base stations, exporting over 25% of its production. The first wholly owned subsidiary was opened in Huntingdon, UK.
- In 1982, Tait opened facilities in Houston, United States.
- In 1988, Tait opened facilities in Brisbane, Australia.
- In the mid-1980s Tait moved into developing trunking technology. Substantial investment followed in a broad range of trunked products and TaitNet systems based on the open MPT 1327 standard.
- In 1990, the T800 series of modular base station and repeater equipment was on the market. The T700 series also appeared.
- In 1992, the T2000 series of mobile radios was released.
- In 1993, additional offshore subsidiaries were opened and the T3000 series of hand-portables and the Quasi-Sync base station/repeater systems were introduced.
- In 1994, the first in a series of mobile data despatch products for use with the T2000 radios was launched.
- In 1996, the T3000 Series II, an enhanced version of the portable series, went to market.
- In 1997, Tait's T2000 range was updated with the launch of the T2000 Series II.
- In 1998, Tait released the Orca series of portable radios. Additional base-station and system enhancements followed, including the T1810 single-site trunked channel controller, before the release of Tait's portable radio range, the Tait Orca 5000.
- In 2003, the release of the 8000 tier of base stations and mobiles replaced the T800 base station and T2000 mobile.
- In May 2005, Tait launched P25 (Project 25) products based on open standards and open interfaces.
- In 2008, the TP8100 replaced the Orca portable radio.
- In 2010, Tait opened facilities in Vienna, Austria.
- In 2011, Tait opened facilities in Melbourne, Australia and expanded in Beijing, China. (Office in Beijing has been shut down)
- In 2012, Tait Electronics Ltd changed its name to Tait Limited, Tait launched its DMR Tier 3 and P25 phase two platforms.
- In 2014 the regional office in Huntingdon UK was closed and opened office in Milton, Cambridge UK
- In 2021 Tait launches AXIOM Broadband and cellular radio solutions
- In 2022 Tait wins a NZ$1.4 Billion contract to provide a nation wide P25 Phase Two Digital Trunked radio network for emergency services in New Zealand under the Public Safety Network(PSN) Program.
- In 2023 Tait secures a contract to provide new digital fire ground radios to the London Fire Brigade.
- In 2024 Tait rolls out new MultiBand and Multi Protocol DMR and P25 all in one radio solutions launching the TP9900 Portable radio.
- In 2025 Tait buys Australia based digital-evidence management, body worn and vehicle camera company m-View. Tait takes over New Zealand publicly listed company Vital who provide nationwide DMR and MPT1327 commercial radio solutions and fibre broadband products in New Zealand.

== Technologies and solutions ==
- P25 (Project 25)
- DMR (Digital Mobile Radio)
- MPT 1327
- MPT-IP
- Distribution Automation
- Network Management
- AXIOM (Radio over IP)
- Body and Vehicle cameras (m-View)

== Corporate affairs ==
=== CEO ===
- Alan Martyn Gall - General Manager Nov 1992 to Jan 1998
- Warren Francis Rickard - Chief Executive - Jan 1998 to May 2001
- David Michael Chick - Managing Director - Jun 2001 to Jun 2009
- Frank Owen was the CEO of Tait Communications from March 2009 until April 2014. Previously he was the CEO at privately owned Australian company GPC Electronics. In April 2014, David Wade has been appointed as the acting CEO until a replacement for Frank Owen was found.
- Garry Diack was CEO from September 2014 until June 2021, after having been a director of the board since July 2014.
- Yoram Benit was made Interim CEO in June 2021, before being confirmed by the board as CEO in January 2022.

=== Structure ===
Sir Angus Tait (founder) established a trust structure for the company to be held in. The company is owned by two trusts: the Contel Charitable Trust and The Tait Foundation. Tait is financially independent and audited annually by PricewaterhouseCoopers.

=== Corporate recognition ===
Tait Communications has received the following awards:

- Canterbury Champion Supreme Award (2003)

Tait partners with the following associations and groups in their industry:

- Funding and oversight of Wireless Research Centre, located at the NZi3 Innovation Institute, University of Canterbury, Christchurch, New Zealand
- Founding member of the DMR Association
- Member of International Association of Public Transport
- Associate Member of the Utilities Telecom Council

=== Offices by location ===
- Australia – Brisbane, Melbourne
- Austria – Vienna
- Brazil - Sao Paulo
- France - Paris
- New Zealand – Christchurch
- Singapore
- UK - Swavesey -
- USA – Houston
- Locations information via Tait website
