= JVCKenwood =

Japanese multinational electronics company

JVCKenwood Corporation

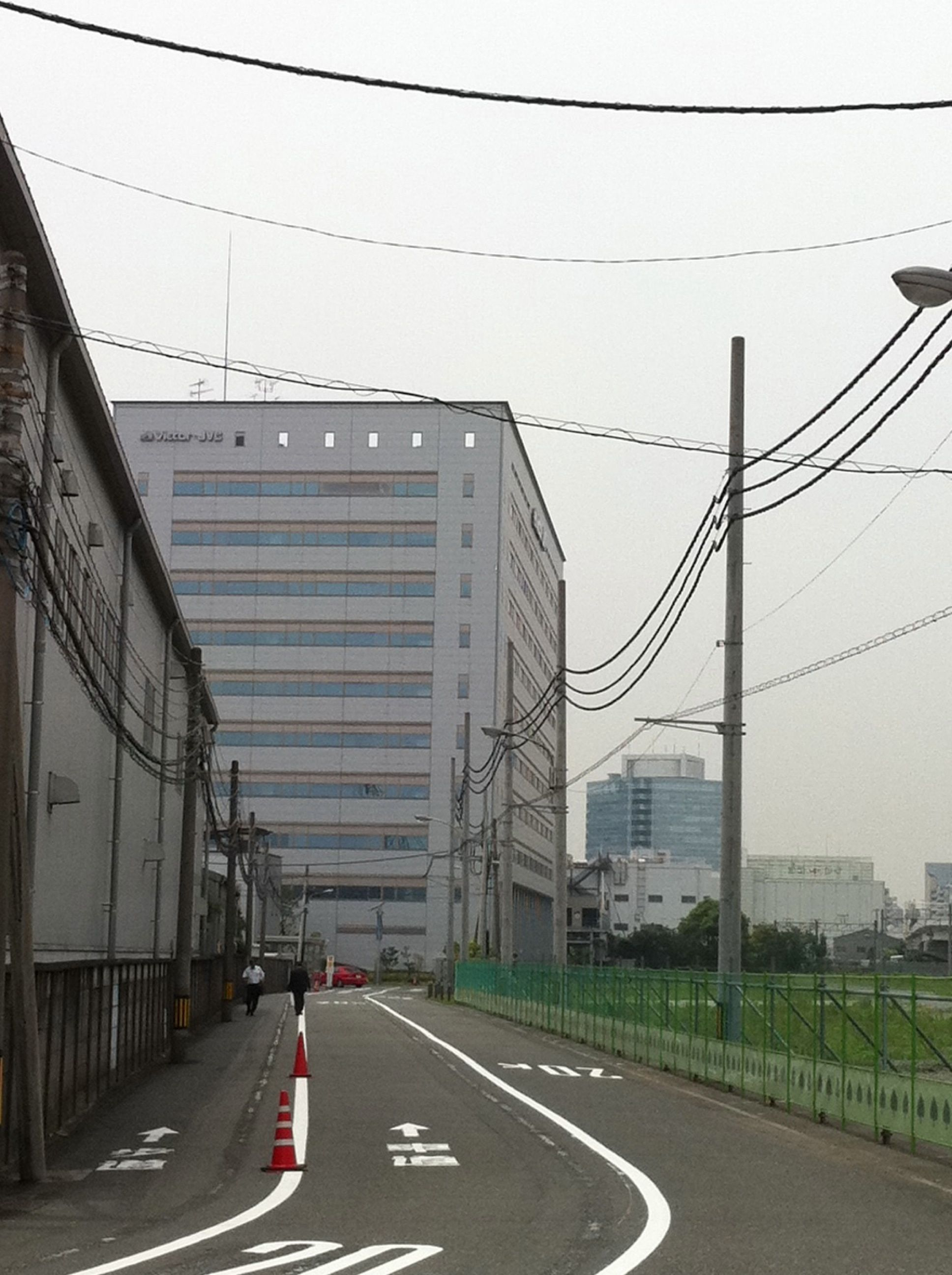
- Headquarters in Kanagawa-ku, Yokohama
- Native name: 株式会社JVCケンウッド
- Romanized name: Kabushiki-gaisha Jē bui shi Ken'uddo
- Formerly: JVC Kenwood Holdings, Inc. (2008–2011)
- Type: Public
- Traded as: TYO: 6632
- Industry: Electronics
- Predecessors: Victor Company of Japan, Ltd.; Kenwood Corporation
- Founded: 1 October 2008; 17 years ago
- Headquarters: Kanagawa-ku, Yokohama, Kanagawa, Japan
- Key people: Shoichiro Eguchi (president and CEO)
- Products: Audio, visual, computer-related electronics and software, media products
- Brands: JVC/Victor; Kenwood
- Revenue: ▼JP¥274 billion (2021)
- Operating income: 21,634,000,000 yen (2023)
- Net income: ▲JP¥4.9 billion (2021)
- Total assets: 299,000,000,000 yen (2023)
- Number of employees: Non-consolidated: 2,987, Consolidated: 18,051 (2017)
- Subsidiaries: EF Johnson Technologies; Victor Entertainment
- Website: jvckenwood.com

JVCKenwood Corporation (株式会社JVCケンウッド, Kabushiki-gaisha Jē bui shi Ken'uddo), stylized as JVCKENWOOD, is a Japanese multinational electronics company headquartered in Yokohama, Kanagawa Prefecture, Japan. It was formed from the merger of Victor Company of Japan, Ltd. (JVC) and Kenwood Corporation on 1 October 2008. Upon creation, Haruo Kawahara of Kenwood was the holding company's chairman, while JVC President Kunihiko Sato was the company's president. JVCKenwood focuses on car and home electronics, wireless systems for the worldwide consumer electronics market, professional broadcast, CCTV and digital and analogue two-way radio equipment and systems.

== History ==
On 1 October 2008, Victor Company of Japan, Ltd (JVC) and Kenwood Corporation signed an agreement to integrate their management through the establishment of a joint holding company (stock transfer). The joint holding company was named JVC Kenwood Holdings, Inc.

On 31 May 2010, JVC Kenwood announced that it would end camcorder production in Japan by March 2011 and shift production overseas to cut losses.

On 1 August 2011, JVC Kenwood Holdings, Inc. was renamed to JVCKenwood Corporation and an absorption-type merger was finalized for the JVC and Kenwood subsidiaries, which occurred two months later. The absorption merger ended the separated operation of two companies.

On 25 March 2014, JVCKenwood acquired 100% ownership of EF Johnson Technologies, in order to "increase its P25 North American public safety and professional LMR system market share". EF Johnson became a wholly owned subsidiary.

On 10 December 2018, JVCKenwood acquired 40% ownership of Tait Communications.

In 2020, JVCKenwood Launched its first virtual reality headset for entertainment experiences.

In 2023, JVCKenwood streamlined its finance operations by automating processes on a unified Oracle Cloud platform.

== Units ==
=== Brands ===
- JVC – consists of audio equipment, cameras, medical monitors, security utilities and projectors. Known for producing the first television for the Japanese market in 1939 and developed the video home system (VHS) in the early 1970s.
- Kenwood – consists of in-car devices, hi-fi home and personal audio equipment, professional two-way radio communication equipment, as well as the amateur radio equipment.
- Victor – consists of audio equipment for the high-end segment.

=== Subsidiaries ===
- EF Johnson Technologies – Multi-band portable radio company.
- Victor Entertainment – distributes music, movies, and other entertainment products.
