= Angus Tait =

New Zealand businessman (1919–2007)

Sir Angus Tait KNZM OBE
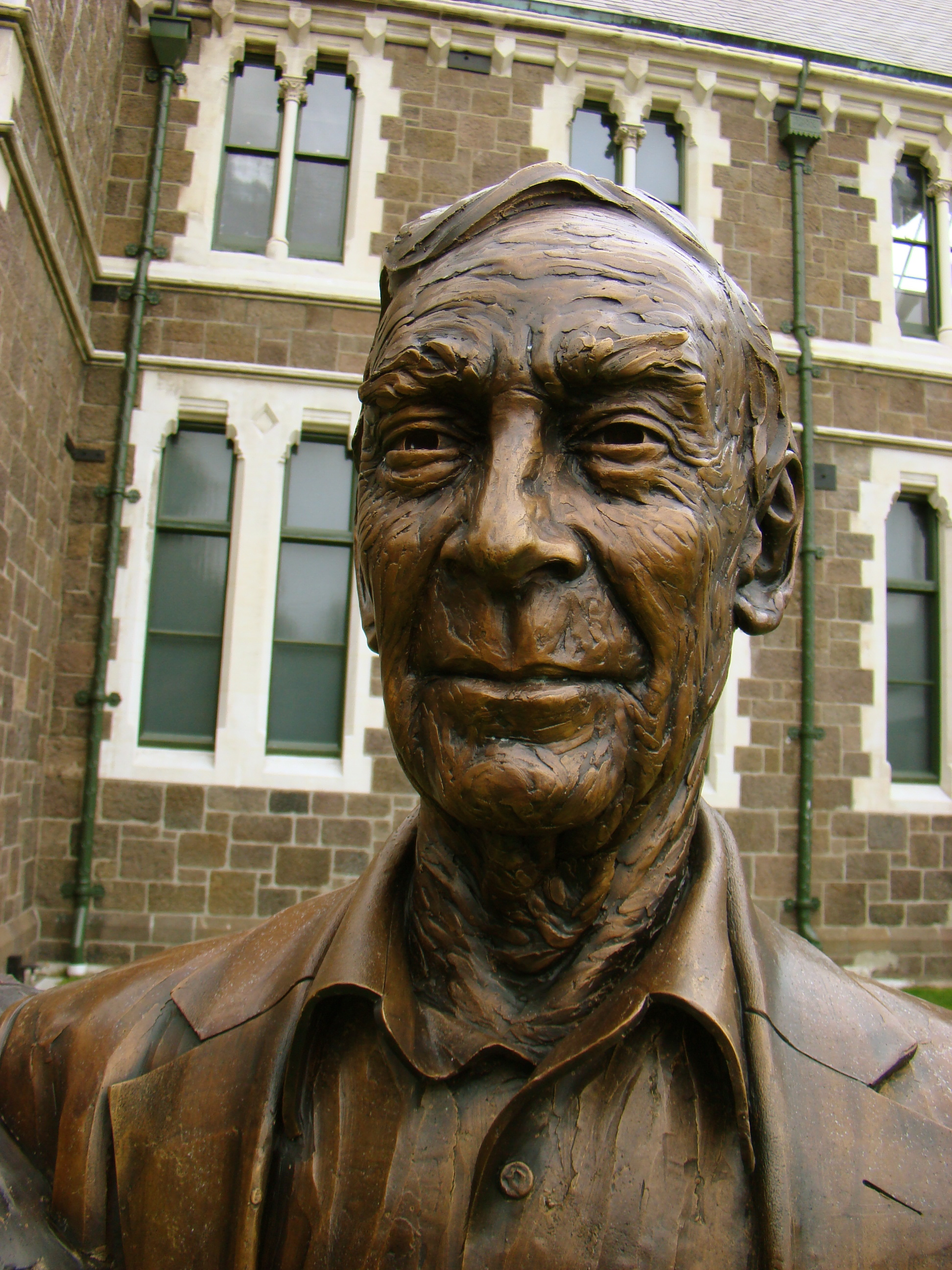
- Bronze bust of Sir Angus Tait as part of the Twelve Local Heroes sculpture
- Born: 22 July 1919; Oamaru, New Zealand
- Died: 7 August 2007 (aged 88); Christchurch, New Zealand
- Occupations: Electronics innovator, philanthropist and businessman

Sir Angus McMillan Tait KNZM OBE (22 July 1919 – 7 August 2007) was a New Zealand electronics innovator and businessman.

Tait had a childhood fascination for electronics and during and after high school at Waitaki Boys' High School, he worked in a friend's (Kempton Collett) radio store. He served with the Royal New Zealand Air Force and also the Royal Air Force instructing as a second lieutenant on radar in Britain, during World War II.

After the war, he designed and built mobile radio equipment, although his first company went into receivership. In 1969, he founded Tait Electronics Ltd, now operating as Tait Radio Communications, Christchurch (New Zealand), with men who had decided to remain loyal and see him through; now his company is considered a world leader in mobile radio. He had persisted in keeping his manufacturing base in New Zealand, with 95 per cent of production exported to 160 countries.

In the 1992 New Year Honours, Tait was appointed an Officer of the Order of the British Empire, for services to manufacturing and export. In 1996, he was inducted into the New Zealand Business Hall of Fame. He was awarded the IEEE Ernst Weber Engineering Leadership Recognition in 1998. In the 1999 Queen's Birthday Honours, he was appointed a Knight Companion of the New Zealand Order of Merit, for services to technology, manufacturing and export. In 2003 he was the Inaugural New Zealand High Tech Award Winner. Presently, Tait's company employs in excess of 850 people. In March 2009, Tait was commemorated as one of the Twelve Local Heroes, and a bronze bust of him was unveiled outside the Christchurch Arts Centre.

He died in 2007, at the age of 88.
