= World Wide Check-In =

International amateur radio DMR net

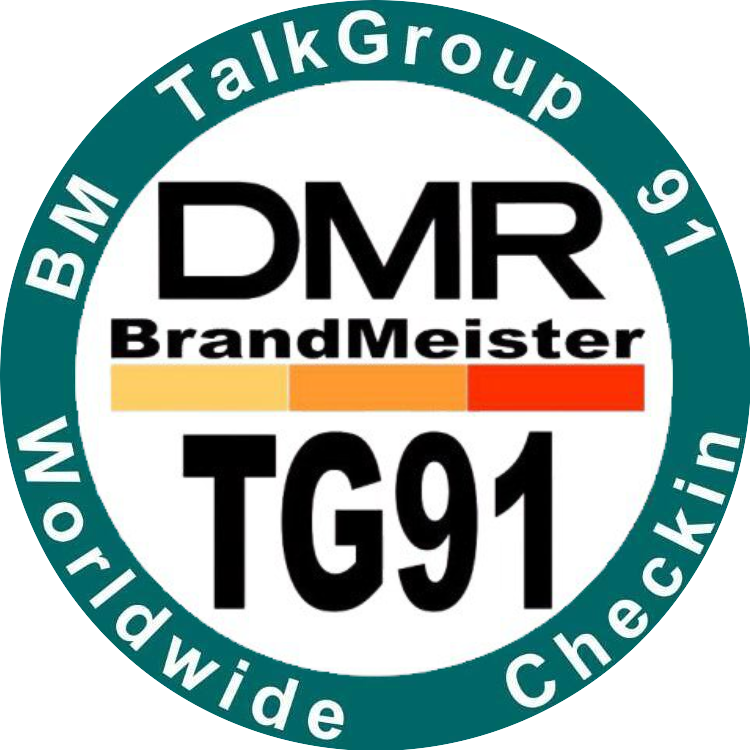
- Official logo of the World Wide Check-In
- Abbreviation: WWCI
- Founded: 2015
- Founder: Richard D. Decker (K6SUU)
- Type: Amateur radio net
- Purpose: Worldwide amateur radio communications
- Region served: Worldwide
- Official language: English
- Website: www.worldwidecheckin.net

World Wide Check-In (WWCI) is an international amateur radio net conducted via Digital Mobile Radio (DMR) on Talk Group 91 of the BrandMeister network. Founded in 2015 by amateur radio operator Richard D. Decker (K6SUU), the net provides licensed amateur radio operators with a structured environment for making worldwide contacts, exchanging signal reports, and participating in organised net operations.

The net takes place every Saturday at 16:00 UTC and attracts participants from multiple countries and continents.

== History ==
The World Wide Check-In was established in 2015 to provide amateur radio operators with a regular opportunity to communicate with stations worldwide using digital voice technology.

The growth of internet-connected repeater systems, personal hotspots and the BrandMeister DMR network enabled participation from operators located across North America, South America, Europe, Africa, Asia and Oceania.

The BrandMeister worldwide net on Talk Group 91 has been documented in amateur radio net listings since at least 2017.

As participation increased, dedicated logging systems and multiple Net Control Operators (NCOs) were introduced to support the growing number of check-ins and maintain efficient net operations.

== Purpose ==
The stated purpose of the World Wide Check-In is to demonstrate the operation and capability of DMR, bring together radio operators from around the world, and show how a globally linked amateur radio network operates.

The net also provides operating experience for licensed amateur radio operators and promotes international communication within the amateur radio community.

== Operations ==
The World Wide Check-In is managed by one or more Net Control Operators who coordinate check-ins, maintain operating discipline and record participating stations.

Typical net operations include:

- Opening announcements by the Net Control Operator.
- Calls for stations by geographical region.
- Recording participant call signs.
- Exchange of signal and audio reports.
- Management of relay traffic where required.
- Publication of participation statistics following net closure.

During extended sessions, control of the net may be transferred between multiple Net Control Operators to ensure continuity of operations.

== Technical format ==
Mode
Digital Mobile Radio (DMR)

Network
BrandMeister

Primary talk group
TG91 Worldwide

Schedule
Every Saturday at 16:00 UTC

Participation
Licensed amateur radio operators

Coverage
Worldwide

Operators may participate using DMR handheld transceivers, DMR mobile radios, fixed-base stations, personal hotspots, or internet-connected DMR gateways.

== Participation ==
Participation is open to licensed amateur radio operators operating in accordance with the regulations of their respective licensing authorities.

Stations may participate through repeaters, personal hotspots and approved network access methods connected to the BrandMeister network. Participants represent multiple countries and regions worldwide.

The net regularly records several hundred unique check-ins during a single operating session.

== Net logging ==
A dedicated digital logging platform is used to record participating stations and generate operational statistics.

Published logs may include call signs, DMR IDs, countries, check-in times, net duration, participation totals and operational remarks.

Historical logs are maintained as an archive of participation data and net activity.

== Community impact ==
The World Wide Check-In provides a platform for international amateur radio communication, operating practice and technical experimentation using DMR.

The net enables operators from different countries and backgrounds to communicate regularly and share experiences relating to amateur radio, digital communications and station operation.

== Significance ==
The World Wide Check-In has operated as a weekly amateur radio net since 2015.

The net has been documented by multiple amateur radio publications, directories and community resources, including ICQ Podcast, NetFinder Radio, RadioID, HamNetList and other DMR-related publications.

Published net logs document participation exceeding 600 stations during some operating sessions.

== See also ==
- Amateur radio
- Digital Mobile Radio
- BrandMeister
- Net control station
- Radio repeater
- Talkgroup
