= Norsat =

Canadian satellite communications company

Norsat International Inc.
- Company type: Subsidiary
- Industry: Communications · Defense
- Founded: 1977; 49 years ago
- Founder: Rod Wheeler
- Headquarters: Richmond, British Columbia, Canada
- Area served: Worldwide
- Key people: Amiee Chan, President & CEO
- Products: satellite terminals, VSAT, microwave components
- Number of employees: 175
- Parent: Hytera
- Subsidiaries: Sinclair Technologies
- Website: www.norsat.com

Norsat International Inc. is a satellite communications company based in Richmond, British Columbia, Canada. The company, founded in 1977, develops and produces communications technology for the transmission of data, audio and video. The company is owned by Hytera, a Chinese company partly owned by Shenzhen Investment Holdings of Shenzhen's municipal government. Norsat's primary customers are from the military, broadcast and maritime industries.

== History ==
The company was founded by Rod Wheeler in 1977 in Whitehorse, Yukon under the name Northern Satellite Systems. Wheeler founded the company after attempting to build the first affordable consumer satellite dish with chicken wire and foil. This satellite dish eventually became the company's first prototype. After the company's IPO, it was renamed Norsat and Rod Wheeler became its first CEO. Norsat produces satellite communication products and is managed by President and CEO, Amiee Chan.

In 2011, Norsat acquired Sinclair Technologies, a Canadian company providing antenna and RF conditioning products.

In 2017, Norsat was sold to Hytera, a Chinese telecom company with the long-standing ties to the country's Ministry of Public Security, for CAD $85 million. The sale was flagged by the United States-China Economic and Security Review Commission as raising "significant national-security concerns for the United States" and its allies. In 2019, Hytera was effectively banned from doing business with U.S. government agencies due to national security concerns.

In 2022, the Royal Canadian Mounted Police terminated a communications equipment contract with Norsat's subsidiary, Sinclair Technologies, over national security concerns.

In April 2023, a ThrustMe NPT30-I2 iodine electric propulsion system was launched on the NorSat-TD satellite. The NPT30-I2 was launched in collaboration with the SpaceX Falcon 9 rocket which took off from the Vandenberg Space Force Base in California.
