= Zetron =

American communication systems manufacturer

- Founded: 1980
- Headquarters: Richmond, Virginia
- Website: zetron.com

Zetron, Inc. is an American company that manufactures integrated communications systems. The company was founded in 1980 and was formerly a subsidiary of JVCKenwood. In May 2021, it was purchased by Codan Communications. Its products are for use by emergency and public safety agencies (fire, ambulance and police), utilities, and transportation companies.

== History ==
Zetron was founded by Milt Zeutschel and John Reece in 1980. Zetron launched paging products for volunteer fire departments (CE-1000) in 1981 and followed that with the release of programmable microprocessor-based radio dispatch consoles (Series 4000) in 1987.

In 1996, the company introduced the first integrated radio dispatch and 9-1-1 call taking solution, which laid foundation for the Max Dispatch system as part of Zetron’s IP-based MAX Suite.

Zetron acquired the ACOM Business Unit from Plessey Asia Pacific Pty Ltd. in 2000. In 2001, the Advanced Communication System (Acom) is introduced, expanding to large-scaled dispatch center capability.

An ACOM-based Voice Communication Control System (VSCS) was fully commissioned in 2002 as the communications component of the Australian Advanced Air Traffic System.

In 2004, IP-based interface is delivered between Acom and M/A-Com's OpenSky.

Zetron was acquired by the Japanese company Kenwood Corporation (now JVCKenwood) in 2007. That same year, Zetron became the first vendor to support the P25 CSSI Console interface.

In 2008, the company started shipping a new IP-based Fire Station Alerting system. The company formed a strategic partnership with Harris Corporation (now L3Harris Technologies) in 2017.

In April 2021, Codan Communications, the communications subsidiary of the Codan Group, purchased the company for $45 million.

Zetron acquired Knoxville, Tennessee-based GeoConex Corporation in February 2023 and, in August of that same year, purchased Eagle Newco from NEC Software Solutions UK Limited.

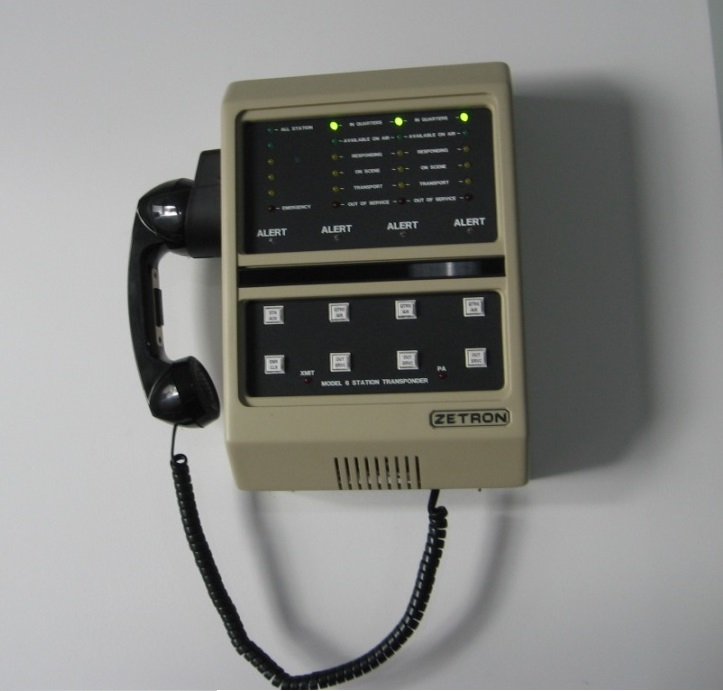
Zetron - Fire Station Alerting

== Products ==
- Radio Dispatch Systems
- E-9-1-1 Call Taking Systems
- Fire station alerting and Dispatch Systems
- CAD and GIS Mapping System - Computer-aided Dispatch (CAD) & Geographic Information System (GIS) Systems
- Specialized integrated communications
- Paging Systems
