= EF Johnson Technologies =

American two-way radio manufacturer, subsidiary of JVCKenwood

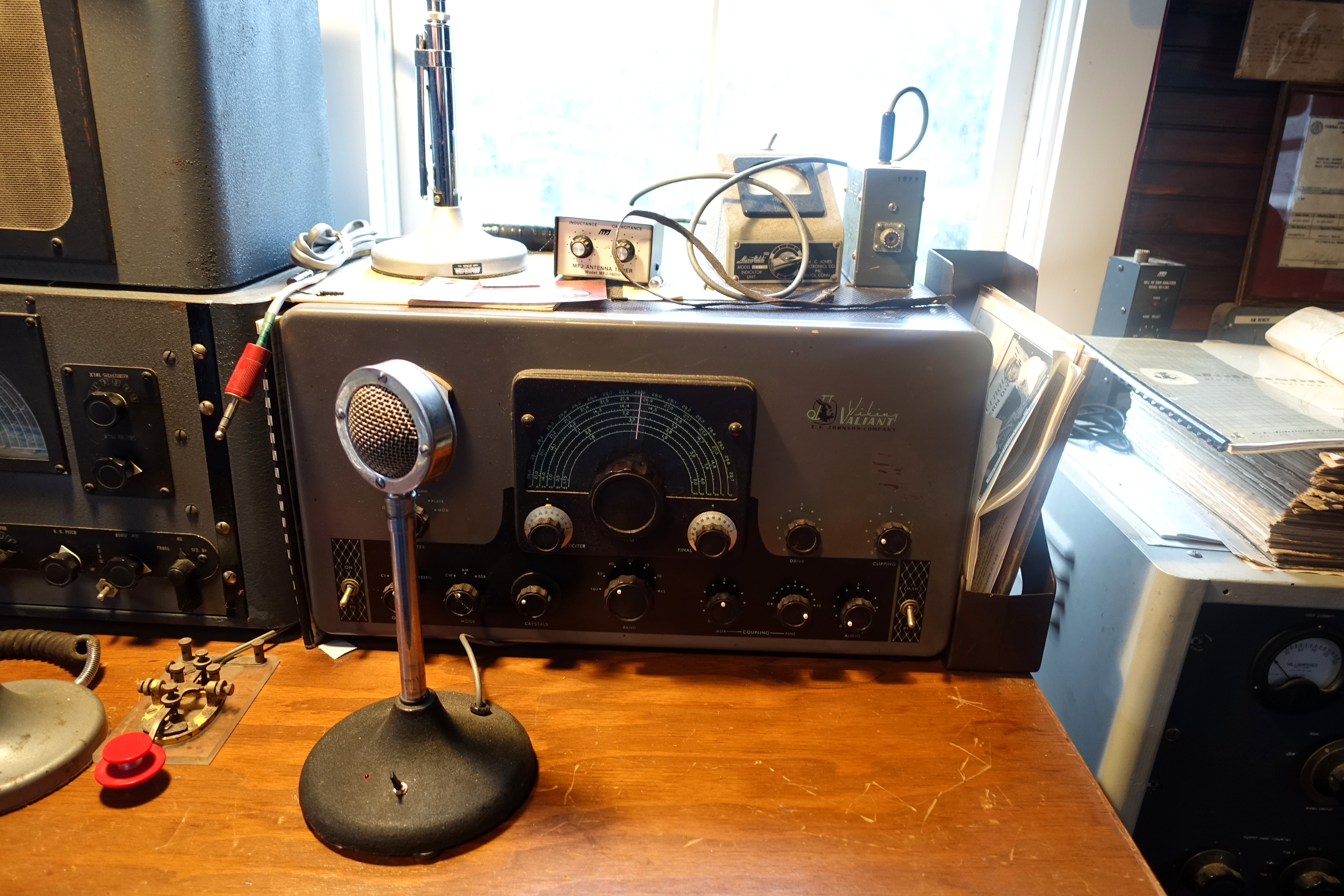
Viking Valiant, E. F. Johnson Company

EF Johnson Technologies, Inc. is a two-way radio manufacturer founded by its namesake, Edgar Frederick Johnson, in Waseca, Minnesota, United States in 1923. Today it is a wholly owned subsidiary of JVCKenwood of Yokohama, Japan.

EF Johnson Technologies offers a wide range of equipment for use by law enforcement, firefighters, EMS, and military. Products include Project 25 systems, portable/mobile two-way radios, and radio encryption products.

== History ==
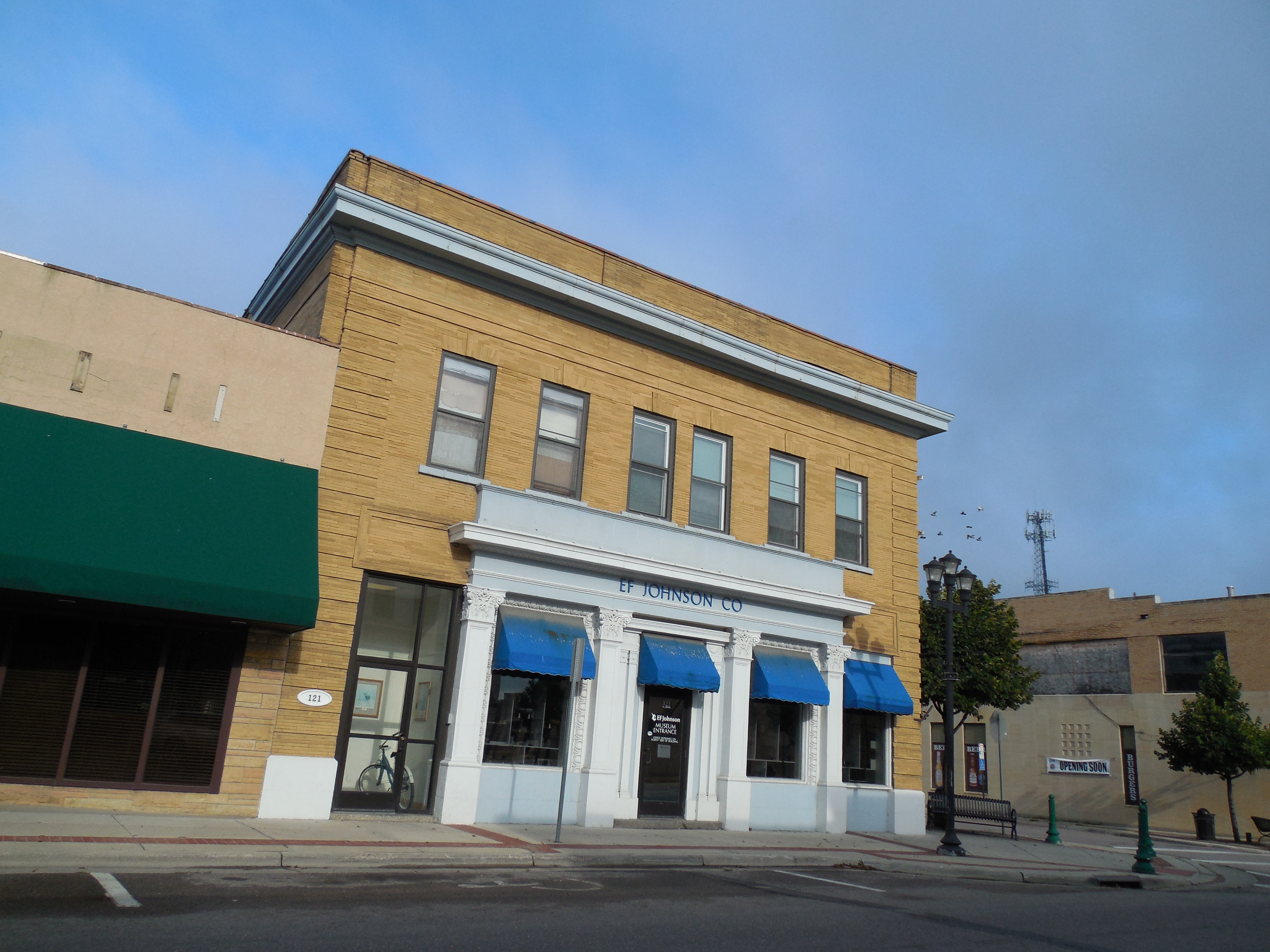
E.F. Johnson Museum, Waseca, Minnesota

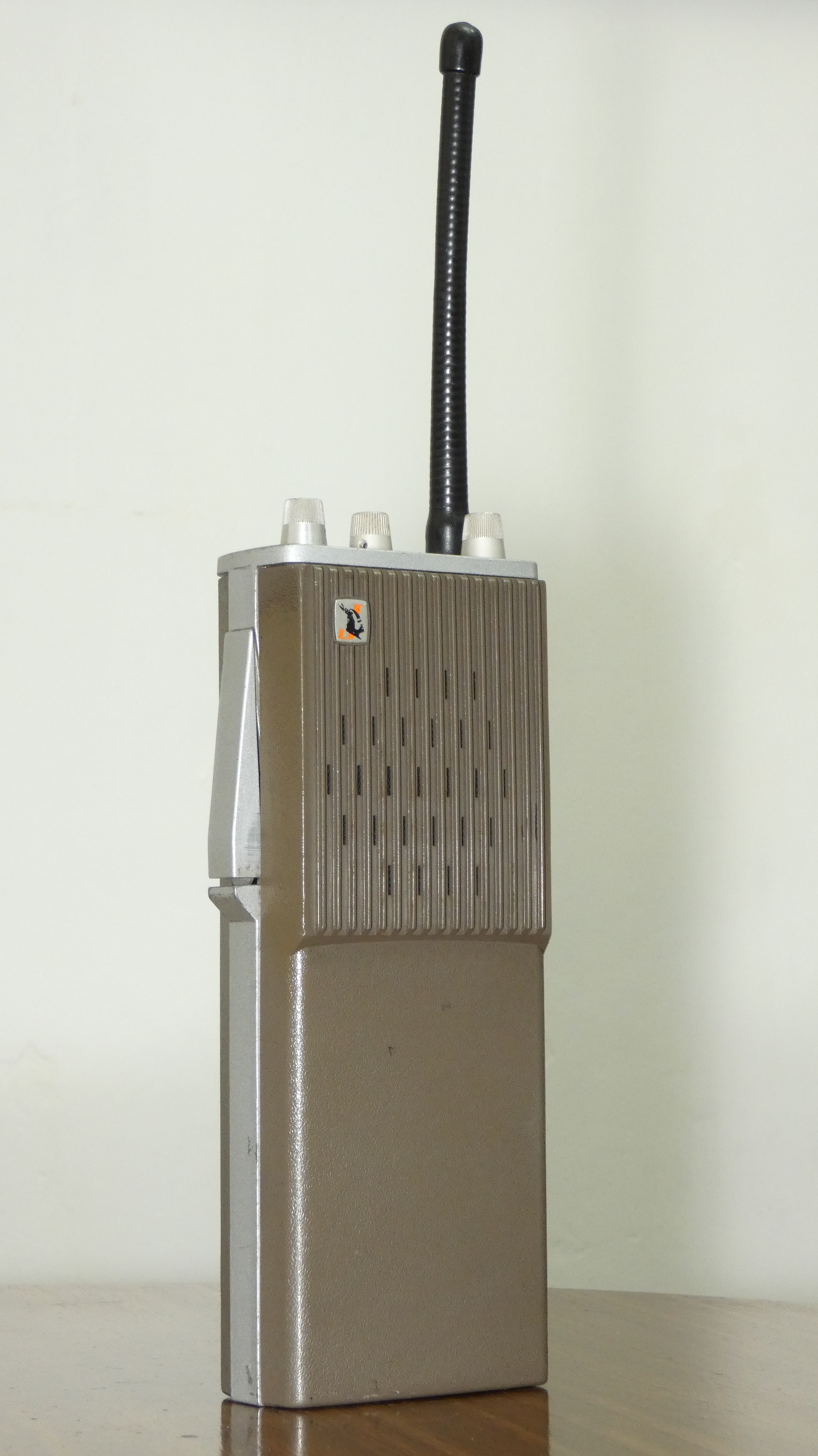
EF Johnson Citizen Band walkie-talkie

The company was founded in 1923 by Edgar F. Johnson and his wife Ethel Johnson. The company began as a mail order business, selling radio transmitting parts to amateurs and early radio broadcasters from space shared with a woodworking shop located in downtown Waseca. In 1936, E.F. Johnson Co. built its first factory and office building in Waseca, and had 17 employees. The company designed and produced electronic components in volume, and was active in World War II defense production. By 1945, the company had grown to 500 employees with expanded facilities in a garage, a nearby grocery store and the Odd Fellows Hall. In 1949, the first of the company's amateur radio transmitters were manufactured, the Viking I model. The Viking line of amateur transmitters included the Valiant, Ranger and Pacemaker. In 1958, the company manufactured equipment for the Class D Citizens Band Radio. One such transceiver, the Johnson Messenger, is exhibited in the Smithsonian Institution as an example of early American-made technology.

The company transitioned to development and manufacturing of land-mobile radio products such as the Logic Trunked Radio trunking format. EFJohnson's discontinued Viking line of amateur radio transmitter products are collected, restored, and operated by a number of vintage amateur radio enthusiasts.

In 1982, the company merged with Western Union, and was later purchased in 1997 by software manufacturer Transcrypt International. Headquarters relocated to Irving, Texas in 2005 and the company became EF Johnson Technologies in 2008. In 2010, EF Johnson Technologies, Inc. was acquired by Francisco Partners, and later absorbed by Japanese electronics company JVCKenwood in 2014.

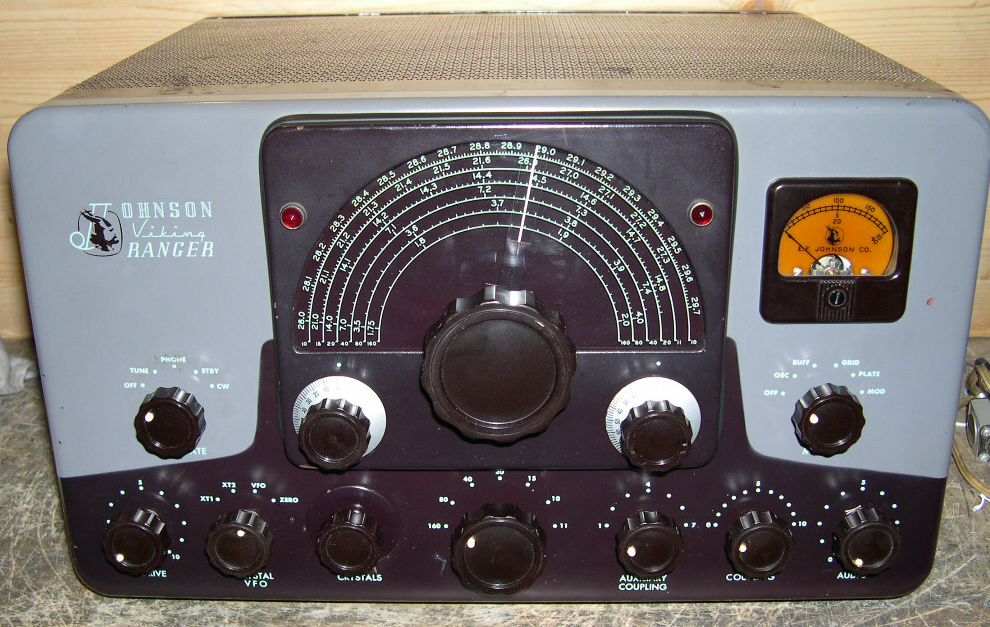
EF Johnson Ranger transmitter, c. 1958

== Product introductions ==
- 2013: Introduced Viking VP900 multi-band portable radio.
- 2012: Introduced Viking VP600 portable radio.
- 2011: Introduced ATLAS P25 System Solutions. Named the Hot Product by APCO's Public Safety Communications magazine.
- 2010: Introduced the 51FIRE ES, the first portable radio engineered specifically for firefighters.
- 2009: Introduced Hybrid IP25, a Project 25 compliant wide area conventional system and a hybrid network intended to allow first responders to operate and interoperate between the conventional and trunked systems and eliminate the need for dispatchers to manually patch calls between the two systems.
- 2009: Introduced StarGate Dispatch Console, an IP-based dispatch console for first responders. StarGate was named the Hot Product by Public Safety Communications, the official magazine of the Association of Public-Safety Communications Officials (APCO).
- 2008: Introduced the Lightning Control Head, a mobile radio control head that incorporates electroluminescent technology.
- 2007: Introduced IP25 MultiSite, a switchless Project 25 trunked infrastructure system that is specifically designed for first responders. This Voice over Internet Protocol (VoIP) based system meets the NTIA mandates for narrowband operation in VHF and UHF frequencies as well as DOD mandates for Project 25 compliance.
- 2006: EF Johnson introduces the Enhanced (AMBE+2) Project 25 Vocoder in its entire radio product line.

== See also ==
- Zetron
- JVCKenwood
