= George Aratani =

Owner of the Kenwood Electronics

- Born: May 22, 1917; Gardena, California
- Died: February 19, 2013 (aged 95); Santa Monica, California
- Known for: Founding Mikasa and Kenwood Electronics

George Tetsuo Aratani (荒谷 哲夫, Aratani Tetsuo; May 22, 1917 – February 19, 2013) was a Japanese American entrepreneur, philanthropist and the founder of Mikasa china and owner of the Kenwood Electronics corporation.

== Early life ==
Born in a farming community outside Gardena, he was the only child of Japanese immigrants Setsuo and Yoshiko Aratani (although his mother had two children from a previous marriage). The family later moved to the San Fernando Valley, and again to Guadalupe, where Aratani attended school while his father established several highly successful farming, manufacturing and international trade companies. While in high school, Aratani was scouted by the Pittsburgh Pirates and briefly considered a career as a professional athlete, but had to change his plans after a football injury soured his prospects.

After graduating from high school, Aratani relocated to Tokyo, following his parents' wishes that he pursue a college education in their home country of Japan. Living with his grandmother in Japan, he spent ten months studying the language before enrolling at Keio University. In December 1935, his mother, who was also staying in Japan at the time, became ill and died. His father remarried Yoshiko's niece, Masuko, and returned to the United States to manage his businesses. Aratani remained in Tokyo and continued his studies at Keio's law school, but he came back to Guadalupe when his father contracted tuberculosis in 1940. Unable to finish his degree at Keio, he enrolled at Stanford University, but after Setsuo's death in April, Aratani, then 22, dropped out to help his stepmother run the Guadalupe Produce Company.

== World War II incarceration ==
In the wake of the attack on Pearl Harbor, and the tide of anti-Japanese sentiment that followed it, Aratani transferred the company's assets from its Issei leaders to its Nisei executives, hoping to avoid losing the business. The move only postponed what would soon prove to be inevitable; after learning he and his stepmother would be "evacuated" with 120,000 other Japanese Americans, Aratani was forced to leave the Guadalupe Produce Company in the hands of trustees from a separate business.

Under the directive of Executive Order 9066, Aratani was removed to the Tulare Assembly Center before being transferred to the War Relocation Authority camp at Gila River, Arizona. Shortly after arriving in camp, the office of the Superintendent of Banks, which had taken over the frozen assets of Japanese banks operating in the U.S. before the war, began to pursue Aratani in order to collect on a loan issued to his father by Sumitomo Bank. With little access to alternatives from within camp, Aratani and the Guadalupe board sold the company to the trustees, barely covering the taxes due to the government. Aratani's biography, "An American Son: The Story of George Aratani," details the losses his family endured during the 1940s.

Since Aratani was bilingual, he was allowed to leave the camp in 1944 to serve at the Military Intelligence Service Language School, where he taught Japanese to American soldiers, including many Nisei. Before arriving at the Camp Savage school, he married Sakaye Inouye, who had been interned at the nearby Poston camp. The couple had two daughters, Donna and Linda.

== Post-war business and philanthropy ==
After the war, the Aratanis returned to California, settling in Hollywood. Aratani established an international trading company in 1946, working with former Guadalupe Produce Company employees and using the name of one of his father's prewar businesses, All Star Trading. The company changed its name to American Commercial, Inc., and tried importing various products before finding a profitable market in Japanese-made chinaware. The Mikasa brand was founded in December 1957 and quickly became popular in the United States, eventually going public in 1994. Aratani continued to expand, creating a medical equipment exporting business in 1951 and establishing Kenwood Electronics in 1961, again employing friends from Guadalupe or the Military Intelligence Service.

Much of Aratani's philanthropy focused on the Japanese American community. He helped found the Keiro Nursing Home in 1961, putting his home up for collateral on the initial loan. Under his guidance and through his contributions, Aratani helped with the restoration of numerous historical buildings in Los Angeles' Little Tokyo and was key to the creation of its Japanese American Cultural and Community Center. The JACCC's Aratani Japan America Theatre, the Japanese American National Museum's George and Sakaye Aratani Central Hall, and the Union Center for the Arts' Aratani Courtyard (all located within Little Tokyo) are named after Aratani and his wife. In 2004, at UCLA, he and Sakaye endowed the United States' first academic chair to study the World War II incarceration of Japanese Americans and their efforts to gain redress.

Aratani spent his later years in the couple's Hollywood Hills home (built by Sakaye's brother-in-law in 1958). He died February 19, 2013, at age 95.
