= Hytera =

Chinese radio manufacturer

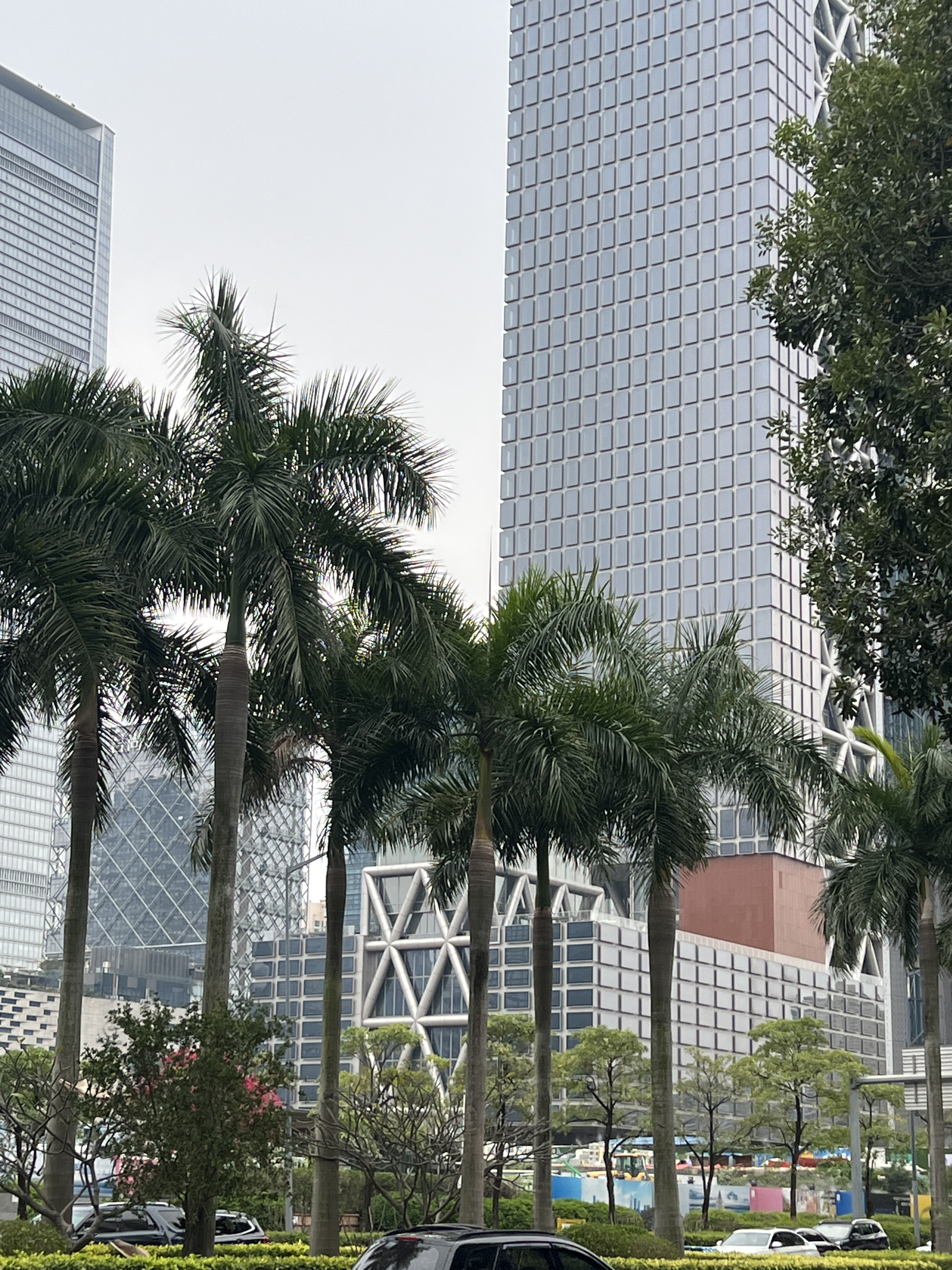
- Headquarters in Shenzhen
- Native name: 海能达
- Company type: Public; partly state-owned
- Traded as: SZSE: 002583
- Industry: Telecommunications
- Founded: 1993
- Headquarters: Shenzhen, China
- Key people: Chen Qingzhou (President)
- Products: Two-way radios Networking systems
- Number of employees: 7,000 (2018)
- Subsidiaries: Norsat, Sinclair Technologies
- Website: www.hytera.com

Hytera
- Simplified Chinese: 海能达
Transcriptions
Standard Mandarin
- Hanyu Pinyin: Hǎinéngdá

Hytera is a Chinese publicly traded partly state-owned manufacturer of radio transceivers and radio systems founded in Shenzhen, Guangdong in 1993. Hytera is listed on the Shenzhen Stock Exchange and is a major contributor to the PDT Standard, which is designed for law enforcement in China. The company is a major supplier to China's Ministry of Public Security.

== Ownership ==
Shenzhen Investment Holdings, a state-owned enterprise, acquired a stake in the company in September 2021.

== History ==
The company's head office is in Shenzhen, China. Hytera's products are developed at three development sites in total. One of the development sites is located in Bad Münder, Germany. In March 2012 Hytera acquired the German company Rohde & Schwarz Professional Mobile Radio GmbH from the German electronics group Rohde & Schwarz, which is now known as Hytera Mobilfunk.

=== United States ===
In June 2007, Hytera acquired Marketronics Corporation, now known as Hytera America, Inc., located in Miramar, Florida. In 2019, Hytera and several other Chinese-based companies, including Huawei, were placed on a ban list of the 2019 National Defense Authorization Act (NDAA) from doing business with U.S. federal agencies due to national security and human rights concerns.

On May 27, 2020, Hytera America and Hytera America (West) filed for Chapter 11 bankruptcy citing ongoing lawsuits brought by Motorola Solutions and the impact of the COVID-19 pandemic.

On January 12, 2021, Hytera US Inc., a new subsidiary of Hytera's in the U.S., set up following the court procedures, officially began to operate its business.

==== Federal ban ====
In March 2021, the Federal Communications Commission (FCC) declared that Hytera video surveillance and telecommunications services and equipment "pose an unacceptable risk to U.S. national security." After President Joe Biden signed into law the Secure Equipment Act of 2021, in November 2022, the FCC banned sales or import of equipment made by Hytera for national security reasons.

In March 2025, the FCC opened an investigation into Hytera and other Chinese companies regarding operations in the U.S. in violation of restrictions.

==== Litigation with Motorola ====
The company is the defendant, as well as the plaintiff, in ongoing intellectual property litigation with Motorola Solutions. Hytera is also a plaintiff of an antitrust lawsuit against Motorola Solutions. In February 2022, Hytera was criminally indicted in United States District Court for the Northern District of Illinois under charges of technology theft. In April 2024, the court ordered the company to immediately stop selling products worldwide. An appellate court granted Hytera a stay. In January 2025, Hytera pleaded guilty to a single count of criminal conspiracy to steal trade secrets.

=== Germany ===
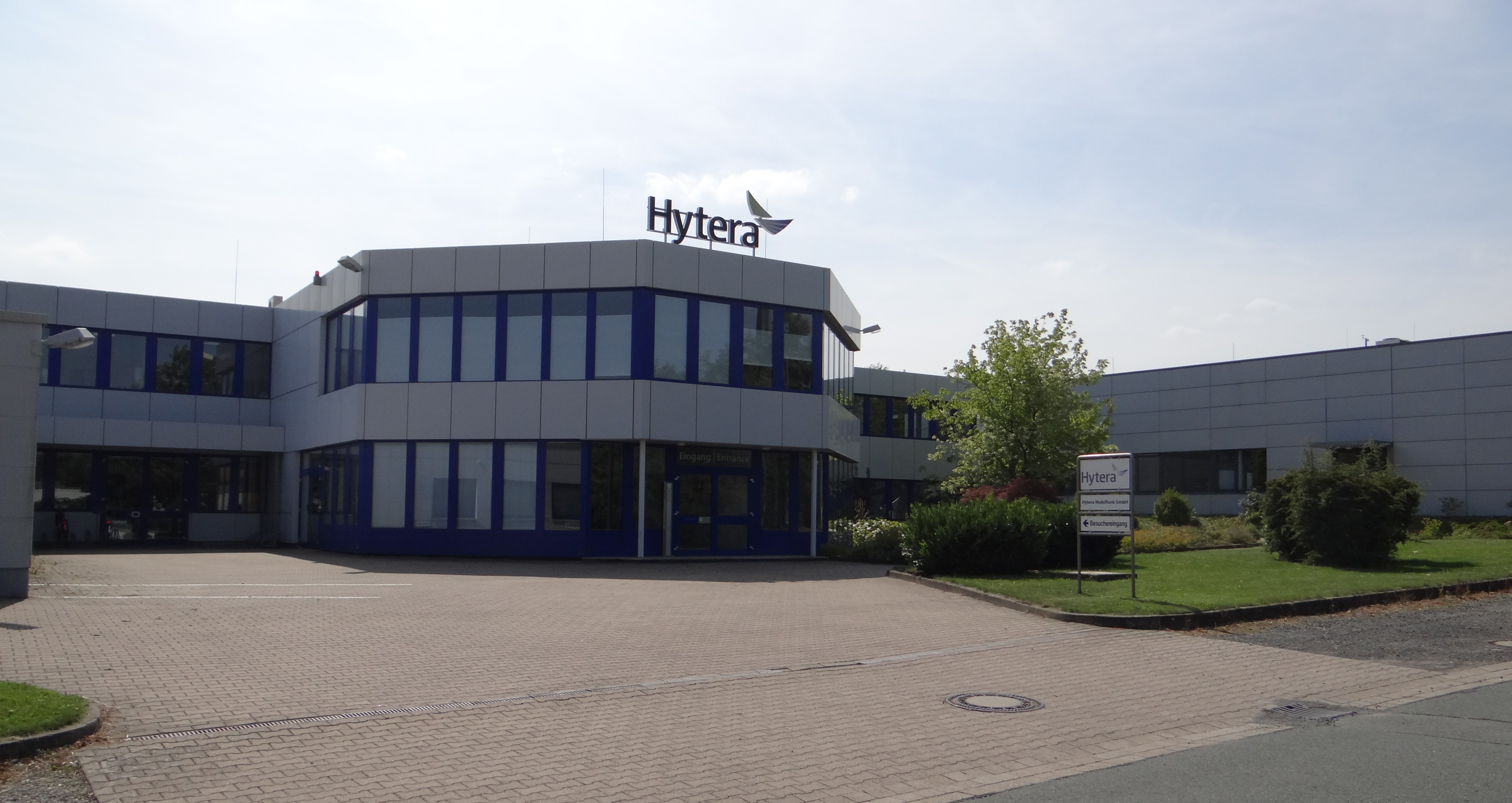
Hytera office in Germany

The German company BICK Mobilfunk GmbH was founded as an engineering firm in 1980 and was absorbed by Rohde & Schwarz as early as in 1988. The company put into service the first TETRA system in Germany. The enterprise primarily deals with the development and implementation of trunked radio systems according to the TETRA standard. In 2011 TETRA division was sold to Hytera Communications Co. Ltd.
