= Combat operations in 1965 during the Indonesia–Malaysia confrontation =

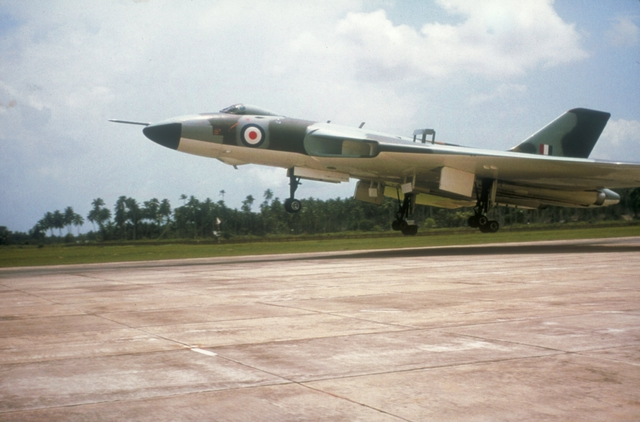
RAF Avro Vulcan bomber lands at RAF Butterworth, Malaysia, c 1965. The presence of these strategic bombers were a considerable deterrence to the Indonesians during the Confrontation period.

The Indonesia–Malaysia confrontation began in early 1963 following Indonesia's opposition to the creation of Malaysia. In December 1964, a build-up of Indonesian forces on the Kalimantan border saw the British government commit significant forces from the UK-based Army Strategic Command and Australia and New Zealand deployed roulement combat forces from West Malaysia to Borneo in 1965–66.

== Opposing forces ==
=== British Commonwealth forces ===
==== Arrival of UK-based units ====
In January 1965, the first UK-based units (aside from air defence and special forces) arrived and after six weeks of jungle training, deployed on operations. The 1st Battalion Gordon Highlanders arrived first and became the thirteenth battalion in Borneo, with 2nd Battalion Parachute Regiment as the fourteenth and last. The two additional battalions allowed DOBOPS to increase the number of brigades. The 2nd and 3rd Divisions of Sarawak (with some 442 miles (711 km) of border with Indonesia) became Mid-West Brigade with HQ in Sibu.

The HQ was that of the UK-based 19 Airportable Brigade, replaced late in the year by 5 Airportable Brigade. Mid-West Brigade area had two infantry battalions and a Malaysian battery. During the year, a Singapore battalion arrived to provide security for Kuching Airfield. Combat engineers also increased, in part to help with civil aid construction projects. UK-based armoured reconnaissance also arrived to provide a second UK squadron in Borneo.

In March 1965, Major General Walter Walker, DOBOPS, handed over to Major General George Lea, who had spent 3 years commanding 22 SAS during the Malayan Emergency and was another very experienced jungle soldier.

==== Increases in artillery and new equipment ====
There was also a significant increase in artillery. From about early 1964, a battery of 4 or 6 105 mm Pack Howitzer guns had rotated through Borneo from the two Royal Artillery regiments in Malaya and Singapore. Later in 1964, a Malaysian battery of four guns deployed in East Brigade. The deployment of the British battery is unclear but appears to have operated single guns throughout the country. In April 1965, 4th Light Regiment Royal Artillery, with all its batteries and 18 105 mm guns, arrived from UK.

Initially, the regiment deployed one battery and Regimental HQ in West Brigade, one battery in Central Brigade and one battery with some guns in East Brigade and some in the west. In August, this changed to two batteries in West Brigade, a third with 4 guns in Central Brigade, and two supporting the British battalion in East Brigade. The existing battery was also in West Brigade, and a second Malaysian battery arrived for Mid-West Brigade.

Half a British battery of 5.5-in Guns based in Malaya was also deployed to West Brigade; their weight meant they could only move by road. Two guns were deployed near Bau, and the third near Tebedu. In addition, the air defence battery at Kuching Airport operated a section of 4.2-inch Mortars near the border. In early 1965, a mortar locating troop deployed from the UK with two Green Archer radars. These were also limited to road movement and deployed in West Brigade. Later in the year, a sound ranging troop was added.

This gave West Brigade a total of three 5.5-in and 16 or 18 105 mm (depending on the type of battery), plus two 4.2-in mortars. The 105 mm were all in single gun positions, usually a company base apart from two at Tebedu co-located with a 5.5 and a Green Archer radar. The other three brigades had 14 105 mm in three batteries. The problem was that 6 batteries and one regimental HQ supporting 4 brigades and 14 battalions did not fit conventional doctrine. Furthermore, there was a shortage of observers. However, British practice was for observers to give fire orders directly to the gun positions, and each gun position produced its own firing data. Additional observers were found by borrowing officers from other units in the Far East and New Zealand.

In 1965, new lightweight equipment arrived, most notably AR-15 rifles. However, equally appreciated by the troops were Australian lightweight individual shelter covers and mosquito nets to replace the heavy British ones. M79 grenade launchers were also provided.

==== Arrival of Australian and New Zealand forces ====
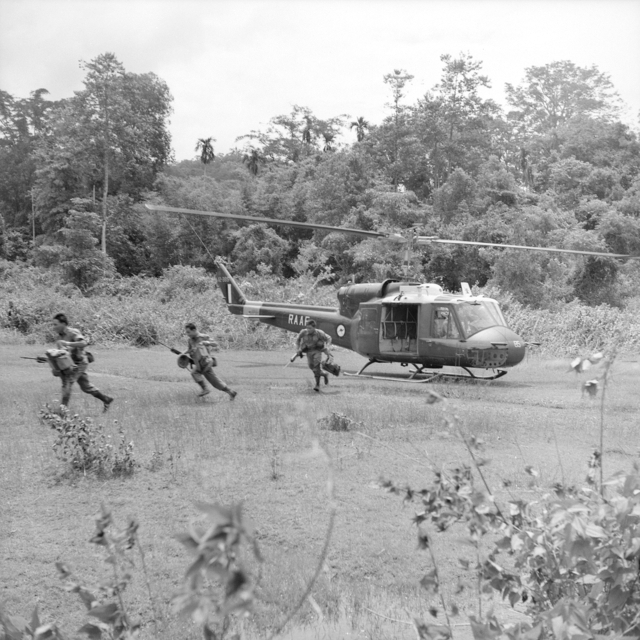
Sarawak Rangers (present-day part of Malaysian Rangers) comprising Ibans leap from a Royal Australian Air Force Bell UH-1 Iroquois helicopter to guard the Malay–Thai border, 1965.

Early in 1965, both Australia and New Zealand agreed to deploy their forces into Borneo as part of the rotation of British and Gurkha units, mostly from those with 28 Commonwealth Brigade in West Malaysia. The brigade's Australian battery rotated with the British batteries from the brigade and the commando batteries in Singapore. These units, together with more UK-based ones, eased the pressure on the UK and Gurkha battalions based in the Far East and rotating through tours in Borneo. Tours were of varying length; Gurkhas generally did 6 months, British battalions in the Far East did 4 months, while the UK-based normally did 12 months less training time and split into two of about 5 months, but deployed in a different area for each half of their tour.

=== Indonesian forces ===
Indonesian forces were also being strengthened. General Maraden Panggabean arrived as commandant of the new Inter-Regional Command, Kalimantan; he had previously been responsible for "recovering" Dutch New Guinea. Units were regrouped and reinforced as No. 4 Combat Command, with Brigadier General Soepardjo as Director of Operations. The new forces were observed by special forces reconnaissance patrols, the Border Scouts and British intelligence agents. They were composed of three full brigades facing Kuching, a KKO brigade facing East Brigade and a battalion facing Central Brigade. This force totalled some 50 regular companies and about 20 irregular ones. The KKO brigade had BTR-50 APCs, amphibious PT-76 light tanks, BRDM-2 amphibious reconnaissance vehicles and 122mm Howitizers. The CCO in Sarawak was estimated to have about 2000 hardcore members, and many thousands of sympathisers. In Brunei, TNKU support still existed.

RPKAD companies rotated in February 1965. The three new companies were Battalion 1's Company B (nicknamed "Ben Hur"), which had aborted their drop into Long Bawan the previous year; and two from Battalion 3, which was newly converted from 441 Banteng Raider III Battalion.

== Operations ==
=== Battle of Kuching ===
During 1965, Sukarno wanted spectaculars to coincide with meetings of the Non-Aligned Movement in April and June, although the latter meeting was cancelled. The KKO planned increased border patrols and shallow incursions disguised as TNKU into Sabah. The RPKAD planned for four teams of seven men from "Ben Hur" company and the Battalion 3 companies already deploying in West Kalimantan, with PGRS guerrillas and support from their sympathisers in Sarawak, to attack targets around Kuching.They launched their attacks in late February. Only one Ben Hur team made any significant progress; moving between PGRS groups, it reached Kuching in May and claimed to have attacked a Malaysian army camp. A PGRS force successfully attacked a police station of the Kuching-Serian road on 27 June.

=== Landing at Long Bawang ===
The Indonesians lost a C-130 in Borneo on 26 September 1965 near Long Bawang airfield into the 5th Division of Sarawak near Ba Kelalan in Sarawak. It was shot down by Indonesian anti-aircraft fire, being mistaken for a Commonwealth aircraft. It was carrying a reinforced RPKAD platoon from RPKAD Battalion 1's Company C (nicknamed "Cobra"). The full company had been sent from Java on orders of the Indonesian high command to "neutralise" a gun position on the border ridge. After the aircraft was hit, the RPKAD parachuted out and the aircraft crashed, but the crew got clear before it caught fire.

Outside Borneo, Indonesian actions included attempts to use Muslim Thai guerrillas in Southern Thailand. Indonesian intelligence also looked for third country routes into Malaysia through Hong Kong, Cambodia and Thailand, where Major Benny Moerdani (formerly of the RPKAD) was under cover as a Garuda airlines official.

Claret operations continued and developed in scope; they were now undertaken by all UK and Gurkha battalions. The permitted depth of operations increased from the initial 5,000 yards to 10,000 and then to 20,000 yards, although the latter figure seems to have only applied to special forces. Regular infantry generally remained within range of artillery support. The Indonesians continued to remain publicly silent about these operations. By mid-year, the program of Claret operations had in effect established a "cordon sanitaire" a few kilometres deep on the Kalimantan side of the border. The Indonesians then laid down thousands of anti-personal mines against the Western Brigade.

=== Battle of Plaman Mapu ===
A significant attack was made by the RPKAD against Plaman Mapu, the base of B Company, 2nd Battalion British Parachute Regiment. It had been identified as a target because it was barely 1 km from the border and lacked mutual support from any other Commonwealth base. The RPKAD companies landed at Pontiak and marched north west to Balai Karangan, south of Kuching and opposite Plaman Mapu. The majority of B Company was out on patrols, and Plaman Mapu was only lightly held. It was composed of a company HQ element, an understrength platoon and a mortar section, all commanded by the Company Sergeant Major.

The RPKAD attack started at 5:00 am on 27 June. It was made by the three platoons of B (Ben Hur) Company of Battalion 1 equipped with AK 47, Bren LMGs and Yugoslav 90mm rocket launchers. The two flank platoons had Bangalore torpedoes. The Indonesians penetrated the perimeter during a driving monsoon rain and overran a mortar pit. Counter-attacks were launched by the paras, and the close-quarter battle lasted nearly two hours. The defenders reported that the Indonesians twice re-grouped and re-attacked, a significant change in tactics. The Indonesians were driven off; the UK estimated inflicting 50 casualties. Two British paratroopers were killed in the fighting, while swift medical attention assured the survival of the wounded. The Indonesians claimed that two RPKAD soldiers were killed, the other two companies (from Battalion 3, newly converted from 441 (Banteng Raider III)) remained in reserve just inside Indonesia throughout the action. Indonesia claimed a major victory, and "Ben Hur" led the Independence Day parade in Jakarta that August. The platoon commanders were all promoted in the field. The action was known as the Battle of Plaman Mapu.

Other actions included a small incursion across the border into eastern Sebatik Island near Tawau, Sabah; the Singapore MacDonald House bombing on 10 March, killing 3 people and injuring another 33; and a very minor terrorist attack in Kuching—a grenade thrown in the market from a motorcycle. Indirect fire attacks became more common.

The best known Claret operation occurred on 21 November 1965. A company from the 2/10 Gurkhas encountered a platoon sized force of Indonesians in an entrenched position in Kalimantan opposite Bau. The position was situated in a manner that allowed only one approach, which was along a ridge that was so narrow that only a small force of three men could move up it in line-abreast formation.

=== Battle of Bau ===
Lance Corporal Rambahadur Limbu led an advanced party of 16 men in an attack on the forward machine gun position, from where they were to provide support to the rest of the company during their attack. They were about 10 yards away when the Indonesian sentry opened fire, wounding one of the Gurkhas and alerting the rest of the platoon. Seeing the danger that they were in, Rambahadur Limbu rushed the machine gun and destroyed it with a grenade. Alerted, the rest of the Indonesian platoon began to fire on the forward pit, thus making it an untenable position from which to provide support for the company attack. In order to report this fact to his platoon commander, Limbu exposed himself to enemy fire before returning to pull two of his wounded comrades to safety. An hour-long fire-fight followed, which has since become known as the Battle of Bau, during which the Gurkha company launched an assault on the Indonesian position. At least 24 Indonesians are believed killed in the attack, while the Gurkhas suffered three killed and two wounded.

Rambahadur Limbu subsequently received the Victoria Cross for his actions, with a misleading citation to obscure the fact that the operation was in Kalimantan. The company commander, Captain Christopher "Kit" Maunsell, a Queen's Gurkha Officer, Lieutenant Ranjit Rai, and the artillery forward observation officer, Lieutenant Doug Fox, Royal Artillery, attached to 170 Imjin Independent Medium Battery RA, each received the Military Cross.

The increase in engineer units helped with developing local infrastructure and hence "hearts and minds". Other units were encouraged to undertake similar tasks within their capabilities. In 1966, the first unit to be awarded the newly instituted Wilkinson Sword of Peace was 40 Light Regiment Royal Artillery for a project near Kuching by its HQ battery and light aid detachment.
