= Combat operations in 1964 during the Indonesia–Malaysia confrontation =

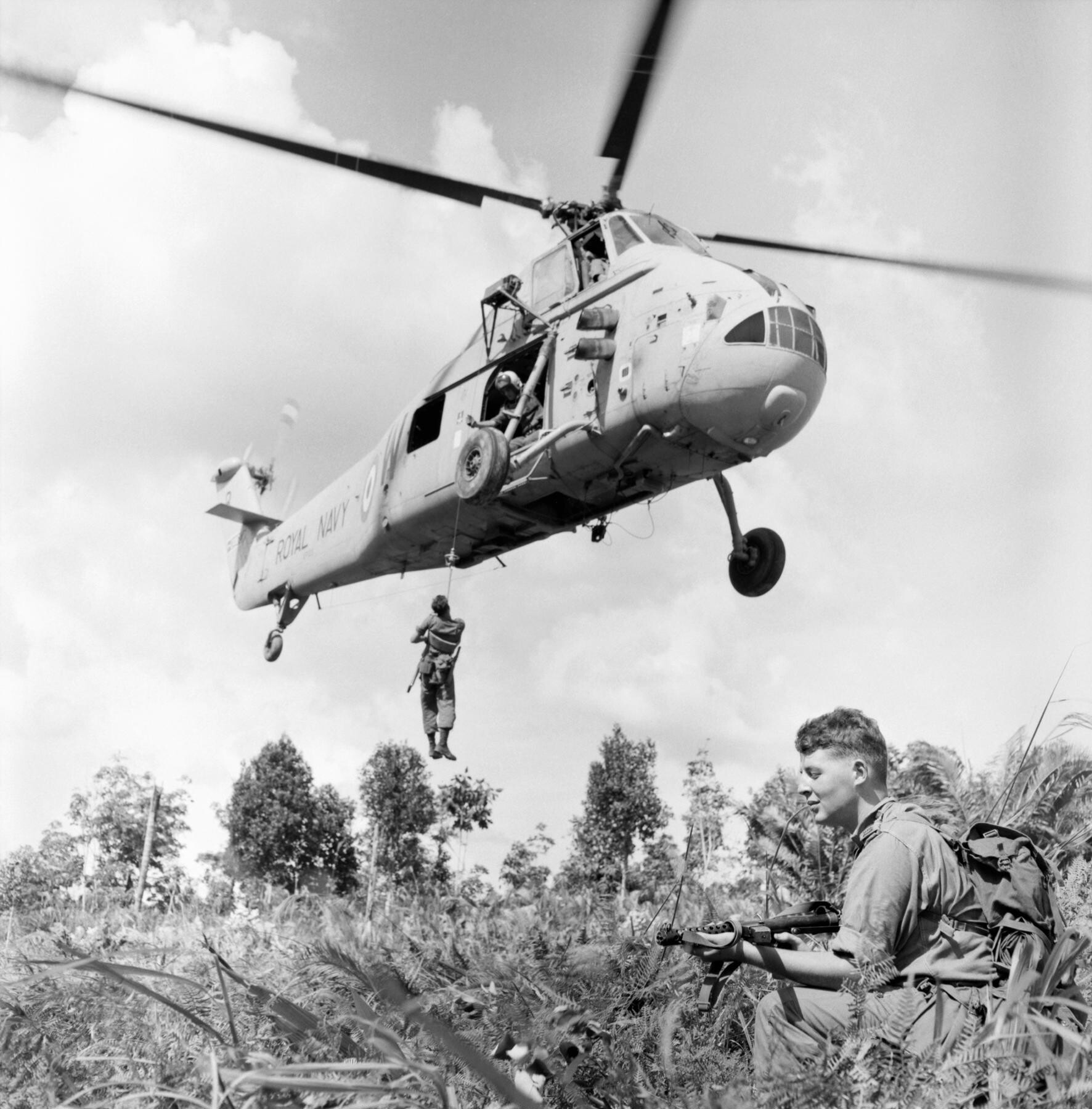
British forces landed from a Westland Wessex helicopter during an operation in Borneo, August 1964.

In 1964, command arrangements changed. 99 Gurkha Infantry Brigade HQ returned from Singapore and replaced 3 Commando Brigade HQ in Kuching. 3rd Malaysian Infantry Brigade HQ arrived to take over East Brigade in Tawau, and 51 Gurkha Infantry Brigade HQ arrived from UK to command the Central Brigade area with the 4th Division of Sarawak added to it. Its headquarters was in Brunei, and there were no roads to any of its battalions. In DOBOPS, all HQ elements were concentrated in one HQ complex on Labuan. At least one of the British batteries stationed in Malaysia was always deployed in Borneo with its 105 mm guns.

In summary, in about the middle of the year the situation was:

- East Brigade (HQ 3 Malaysian Brigade), frontage 81 miles, 3 battalions.

Another Malaysian battalion joined East Brigade mid-year, and was later followed by a third Malaysian battalion, a battery and an armoured reconnaissance squadron. This brought the total force to 12 infantry battalions, two 105 mm batteries and two armoured reconnaissance squadrons. The UK component of 8 battalions in Borneo was being sustained by rotating 8 Gurkha and about 7 UK battalions stationed in the Far East. In addition, there were the equivalent of two Police Field Force battalions and some 1500 Border Scouts.

In 1964, UK tactics changed. What had been a platoon commanders' war became a company commanders' one. Most of the dispersed platoon bases were replaced by heavily protected permanent company bases, mostly a short distance from a village, ideally with an airstrip. Each base normally had a section of two 3-inch mortars and a few had a 105 mm gun, although guns had to be moved to deal with incursions. However, they continued to dominate their areas with active patrolling, sometimes deploying by helicopter and roping down if there was no landing site. When an incursion was detected, troops, sometimes relying on the Border Scouts' local knowledge of tracks and terrain, were deployed by helicopter to track, block and ambush it. The Border Scouts tracking skills were highly valued when pursuing the enemy.

Support helicopters, RAF Belvedere and Whirlwind, and RN Wessex and Whirlwind, had increased to 40, but it was not enough. Late in the year, another 12 Whirlwinds arrived. The RN had adopted forward basing, notably at Nanga Gat in the 2nd Division on the Rajang River, which the RAF had previously declared unsafe for helicopters but subsequently used as a forward base for Whirlwinds. At Bario in the 5th Division, RN helicopters received their fuel in air-dropped 44 gallon drums from RAF Beverleys. The expansion of the Army Air Corps (AAC) was creating air platoons or troops of 2 or 3 Sioux in many units, including some infantry battalions, which proved very useful. In addition, the AAC was operating Auster and Beaver fixed wing aircraft and some of the new Scouts, which could carry a similar number of troops as a Whirlwind. However, in the remoter areas of Sarawak, the Twin Pioneers of the RAF and RMAF were vital, and the RAF's Single Pioneers were also useful. East Brigade had the benefit of RMAF Alouette 3s, and RNZAF Bristol Freighters were also used between major airfields.

The Indonesian Air Force also operated air transport, particularly into the more mountainous areas of the border that were beyond rivers navigable by larger boats and landing craft. Although they had far fewer aircraft than the Commonwealth forces, those they had were far more capable. They included the workhorse helicopter Mil Mi-4 NATO reporting name HOUND, the largest helicopter in the world, Mil Mi-6 NATO reporting name HOOK, C-130 Hercules and Antonov An-12 NATO reporting name CUB. The naval presence was composed of minesweepers and other light craft patrolling coastal waters and some large inland waterways, and a "guardship" (frigate or destroyer) at Tawau. Army vessels, typically "ramp powered lighters", supported bases on navigable waterways. Hovercraft were also used.

RPKAD Battalion 2 was withdrawn in February 1964 and deactivated. During 1964, the Indonesian army (TNI) extended its operation into East Kalimantan, and three companies from RPKAD Battalion 1, commanded by Major Benny Moerdani, were sent there. Company A dropped into Lumbis opposite the Interior Residency of Sabah, while B and C were supposed to go into Long Bawan further West opposite the 5th Division of Sarawak. B's C-130 aircraft was unable to identify the Drop Zone, and they never deployed.

== Raid on Kabu ==
Both companies were tasked with training locals from Sabah, mainly as porters, and cross-border operations disguised as North Kalimantan National Army (TNKU) with uniforms, badges and fake ID cards. Company A launched the first raid in June 1964 against a post near the village of Kabu; however, they were stopped by a swollen river and withdrew to the border. Along the way, they stopped at an unoccupied longhouse, where they bumped into Gurkhas and fled to the border. This company was withdrawn in early 1965.

Within a week or so of landing, a 15 man element of Company C, including its commander, went northeast roughly midway to Lumbis, then crossed into Sabah with orders to establish a permanent base. However, their supplies were inadequate and, after a week, they headed back to Kalimantan in two groups. Along the way in what they thought was Indonesia, the first group of 10 under Corporal Ismael heard chopping, and, assuming it to be TNKU, went towards it hoping for food. Instead around last light in heavy rain they bumped a shirtless Caucasian, who was thought to be an SAS operative. After a fire fight they remained in position all night and in the morning found the body of Tpr Condon, whom they buried, taking his pack and radio. For the rest of their tour until February 1965, they trained TNKU and undertook very shallow cross-border raids with mixed teams, losing 4 RPKAD and 10 TNKU.

During the year, Indonesian forces increased in strength, and incursions were increasingly by regular troops, sometimes led by officers trained by the UK. A United States (US) Army training team remained in Indonesia throughout the period but does not seem to have had any tactical impact in Kalimantan, although US-equipped Indonesian units appeared there. Troops facing Kuching were reinforced, and, in the east, amphibious activities increased, and TAG's communications jammed. Moreover, within Sarawak, the CCO was expanding and the Borneo Communist Party started producing grenades and shotguns. Total Indonesian forces were:

- Facing West Brigade — 8 regular and 11 volunteer guerilla companies (companies were up to 200 strong)
- Facing Central Brigade — 6 regular and 3 volunteer companies
- Facing East Brigade — 4 or 5 KKO and 3 volunteer companies.

The initiative remained with Indonesian forces as to where and when they attacked. DOPOPS had repeatedly sought authority for hot pursuit and pre-emptive action across the border. This was denied, and some parts of the armed forces considered that a major overt attack on Indonesia would bring the war to a close. However, in July the new Labour government approved offensive action across the border, under constraints, conditions of strict secrecy and the codename Claret. However, there was no intention of launching a general offensive or attacks intended to inflict significant Indonesian casualties. The aim was to keep the Indonesians under pressure and off-balance rather than attempt to pre-empt specific Indonesian attacks, and to this end, operations were conducted along the entire length of the border, not just the "hot spot" close to Kuching.

In January, reports indicated a large Indonesian force in the 5th Division. A camp of some 60 men was found. Attacked by 11 men of the Royal Leicestershire Regiment, they fled, leaving 7 dead and half a ton of supplies. In the 1st Division, a force of about 100 crossed the border, apparently heading for Kuching airfield, but they were put to flight by a small force of marines and police. They were well-equipped and had East European-made rocket launchers.

In March, in the 2nd Division, 1/10 Gurkhas discovered a force from the 328 Raider Battalion, which was made up of regular Indonesian troops. After being ejected, they returned a few weeks later and established a position in caves in a cliff face. This led to the only use of offensive airpower in the campaign, albeit with approval from London. Wessex helicopters of 845 Naval Air Commando Squadron fired SS.11 anti-tank missiles into the caves.

Between March and June, a new pattern emerged in the 2nd Division during a series of actions between Gurkhas and professional soldiers from the Indonesian Black Cobra Battalion. The latter's losses were several times the Gurkhas' and, in one incident, 4 Black Cobras clashed with 2 Gurkhas. The Cobras were killed, and the Gurkhas remained unscathed. In another incident, 6 Black Cobras were captured by Ibans and beheaded. In July, there were 34 Indonesian acts of aggression, including 13 border incursions in Borneo. There were indicators that Indonesian forces were re-organising. However, in the last three months of the year, the number of cross border incursions in Borneo dropped significantly.

== Landing at Medan ==
In 1964, Indonesian operations, mostly based in Sumatra, were launched against West Malaysia (the Malayan peninsula). Most did involve the Indonesian army. There were six successful infiltrations by Field Forces Battalion Infranty The Royal Malaysia Police, Malaysia Ranger Regiment(As knowly Sarawak Rangers) Malays Regiment Malayan Recce Regiment(Reconneisance within Ferret Scout Car), although 33 were killed and 76 captured.

== Expansion of the conflict, Sukarno's "Year of Dangerous Living" ==
Coordinated to coincide with Sukarno announcing a "Year of Dangerous Living" during Indonesian Independence Day celebrations, Indonesian forces began a campaign of airborne and seaborne infiltrations of the Malaysian Peninsula on 17 August 1964. On 17 August 1964 a seaborne force of about 100, composed of airforce Pasukan Gerat Tjepat (PGT — Quick Reaction Force) paratroopers, KKO and about a dozen Malaysian communists, crossed the Malacca Straits by boat. They landed southwest of Johore. Instead of being greeted as liberators, they were contained by various Commonwealth forces and most of the infiltrators were killed or captured within a few days.

=== Landing At Labis ===
On 2 September, three C-130 set off from Jakarta for Peninsula Malaysia, flying low to avoid detection by radar. The following night, two of the C-130 managed to reach their objective with their onboard PGT paratroopers, who jumped off and landed around Labis in Johore (about 100 miles north of Singapore). The remaining C-130 crashed into the Malacca Straits while trying to evade interception by an RAF Javelin FAW 9 launched from RAF Tengah. Due to a lightning storm, the drop of 96 paratroopers was widely dispersed. This resulted in them landing close to 1/10 Gurkhas, who were joined by 1st Battalion, Royal New Zealand Infantry Regiment (1 RNZIR) stationed near Malacca with 28 (Commonwealth) Brigade. Operations were commanded by 4 Malaysian Brigade, but it took a month to round up or kill the 96 invaders and a New Zealand officer was killed during the action.

=== Sunda Strait Crisis ===
Indonesia's expansion of the conflict to the Malaysian Peninsula sparked the Sunda Straits Crisis, involving the anticipated transit of the Sunda Strait by the British aircraft carrier Victorious and two destroyer escorts. Commonwealth forces were readied for airstrikes against Indonesian infiltration staging areas in Sumatra if further Indonesian infiltrations of the Malaysian Peninsula were attempted. A tense three week standoff occurred before the crisis was peacefully resolved.

=== Landing At Kesang River ===
On 29 October 52 soldiers landed near the mouth of the Kesang River on the Johore-Malacca border and not far from 28 (Commonwealth) Brigade base at Camp Terendak, Malacca. The Commanding officer of 3rd Battalion, Royal Australian Regiment (3 RAR) was given the task of dealing with the invaders with his D Company, B Company 1 RNZIR and C Squadron 4th Royal Tank Regiment with fire support from 102 Battery Royal Australian Artillery. 20 surrendered, while some others were killed or captured by the Royal Malay Regiment. By the concluding months of 1964 the conflict once again appeared to have reached stalemate, with Commonwealth forces having placed in check for the moment Indonesia's campaign of infiltrations into Borneo, and more recently, the Malaysian Peninsula. However, the fragile equilibrium looked likely to change once again in December 1964 when Commonwealth intelligence began reporting a build-up of Indonesian infiltration forces in Kalimantan.
