= Murphy (disambiguation) =

Murphy is a common Irish surname.

Murphy may also refer to:

== Places ==
=== United States ===
- Murphy, Idaho, an unincorporated village
- Murphy, Missouri, a census-designated place
- Murphy, North Carolina, a town
- Murphy, Texas, a city
- Murphy, Virginia, an unincorporated community
- Murphy, West Virginia, an unincorporated community

=== Argentina ===
- Murphy, Santa Fe, a town

== Businesses ==
- Murphy Aircraft, a Canadian company
- Murphy Oil, an American petroleum and natural gas exploration company
- Murphy Radio, a defunct British manufacturer of home radio sets

== People ==
- Murphy (given name), a list of people and fictional characters
- Buddy Matthews (born 1988), Australian professional wrestler who wrestled in WWE as Buddy Murphy or "Murphy"
- Mikael Judas (born 1974), American professional wrestler known as "Murphy"

== Other uses ==
- Murphy (bald eagle)
- Murphy (novel), a 1938 novel by Samuel Beckett
- Murphy (novella), a 1987 novella by Gary Paulsen
- Murphy (film), a 2024 Indian science fiction musical
- USS Murphy (DD-603), a Benson-class destroyer
- Murphy Oil Soap, a cleaning product
- Murphy High School (Mobile, Alabama), a high school in Mobile, Alabama, U.S.
- Murphy High School (North Carolina)
- Murphy bed, a type of bed that folds up vertically.

== See also ==
- Camp Murphy (disambiguation)
- Murph (disambiguation)
- Murphys (disambiguation)
- Murphy's crow
- Murphy's law
- Robert Cushman Murphy Junior High School, a junior high school in Stony Brook, New York, U.S.
- Murphy's Irish Stout, a dark beer brewed in Cork, Ireland
