= Universal Carrier =

British family of light armoured tracked vehicles

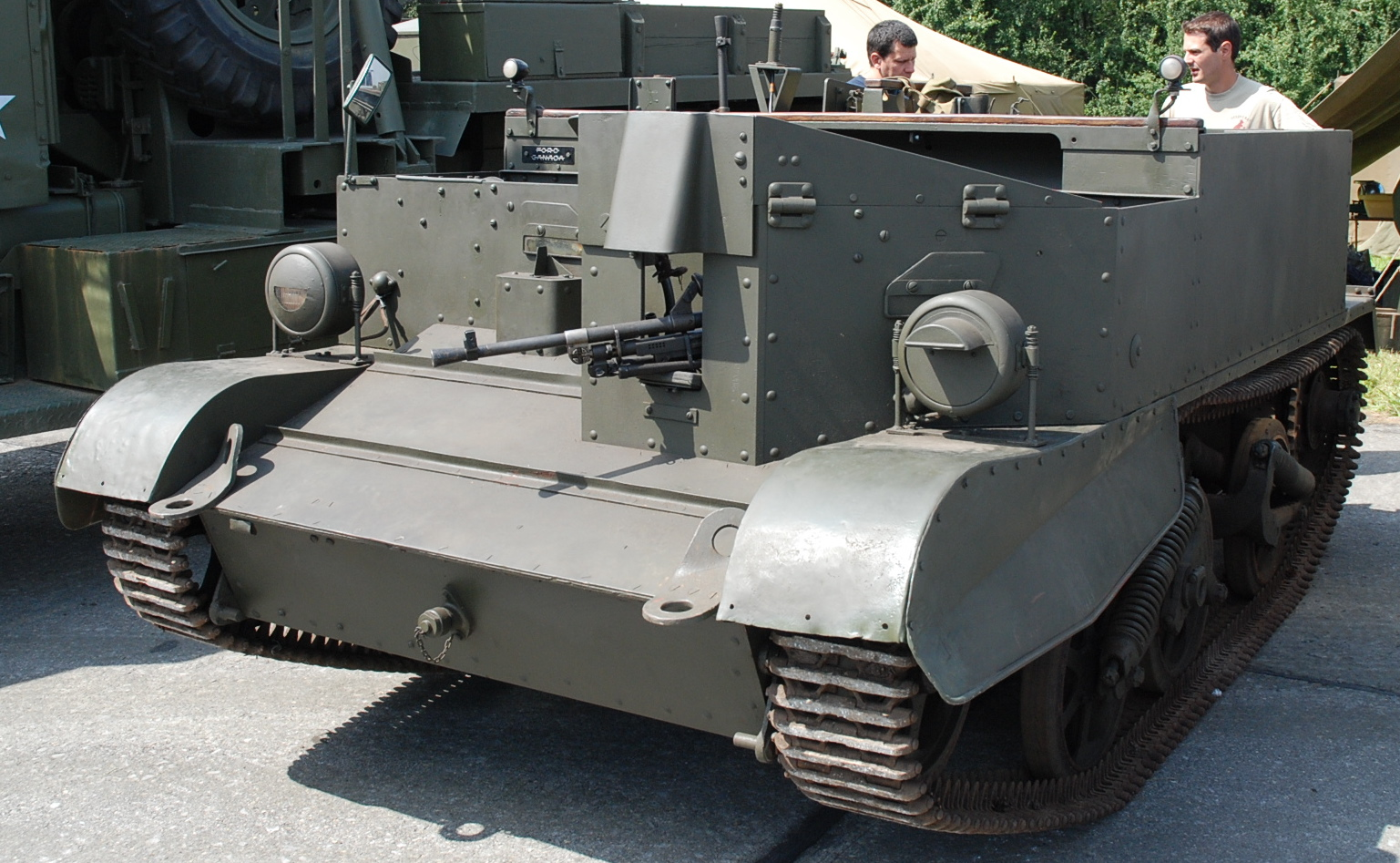
- preserved Universal Carrier as mortar carrier, 2008
- Type: Infantry mobility vehicle / weapon carrier
- Place of origin: United Kingdom

Service history
- Used by: United Kingdom; British Commonwealth; France; Biafra
- Wars: World War II; Indonesian National Revolution; Indochina War; 1948 Arab–Israeli War; Costa Rican Civil War; Korean War; Suez Crisis; Biafran War

Production history
- No. built: 113,000

Specifications (Universal Carrier, Mk 1)
- Mass: 3 ton 16 cwt (3.86 t) laden; 3 ton 5 cwt (3.3 t) unladen
- Length: 12 ft (3.66 m)
- Width: 6 ft 9 in (2.06 m)
- Height: 5 ft 2 in (1.57 m)
- Crew: 3
- Armour: 7–10 mm
- Main armament: Bren light machine gun / Boys anti-tank rifle
- Secondary armament: one Vickers machine gun / M2 Browning machine gun / 2-inch mortar/3-inch mortar / Projector, Infantry, Anti-Tank
- Engine: 239-cubic-inch (4 L) Ford V8 petrol 85 hp (63 kW) at 3,500 rpm
- Suspension: Horstmann
- Fuel capacity: 20 imp gal (91 L)
- Operational range: 150 mi (240 km)
- Maximum speed: 30 mph (48 km/h)

The Universal Carrier, popularly known as the Bren Gun Carrier from its light machine gun armament, was a British armoured tracked vehicle of the Second World War.

The Universal was the culmination of design of a series of light armoured tracked vehicles built initially by Vickers-Armstrongs and then production shared with other companies. The first carriers – the Bren Gun Carrier and the Scout Carrier which had specific roles – entered service before the war, but a single improved design that could replace these, the Universal, was introduced in 1940.

The vehicle was used widely by British Commonwealth forces during the Second World War. Universal Carriers were usually used for light reconnaissance, transporting personnel and equipment under fire, mostly support weapons such as mortars, or as machine gun platforms.

== Design and development ==
The origins of the Universal Carrier family can be traced back generally to the Carden Loyd tankettes family, which was developed in the 1920s, and specifically the Mk VI tankette.

In 1934, Vickers-Armstrongs produced, as a commercial venture, a light tracked vehicle that could be used either to carry a machine gun or to tow a light field gun. The VA.D50 had an armoured box at the front for driver and a gunner and bench seating at the back for the gun crew. The War Office considered it as a possible replacement for their Vickers "Light Dragon" artillery tractors and took 69 as the "Light Dragon Mark III". (Note: A larger Vickers Medium Dragon was used for guns up to 60-pounder) The War Office agreed in 1935 to purchase two for evaluation. One was built as the "Carrier, Machine-Gun Experimental (Armoured)". It had a Vickers machine gun in the front and carried a second machine gun with its four man crew; the latter intended to dismount and operate separately. The passengers were sat either side of the engine protected by armoured sides that could fold down. The decision was made to drop the machine gun and its team and the next design had a crew of three—driver and gunner in the front, third crew-member on the left in the rear behind protection and the right rear open for storage. Fourteen of this design were built in mild steel as "Carrier, Machine-Gun No 1 Mark 1" and entered service in 1936. Six were converted into pilot models for the Machine gun Carrier No.2, Cavalry Carrier and Scout Carrier designs – the remainder were used for training.

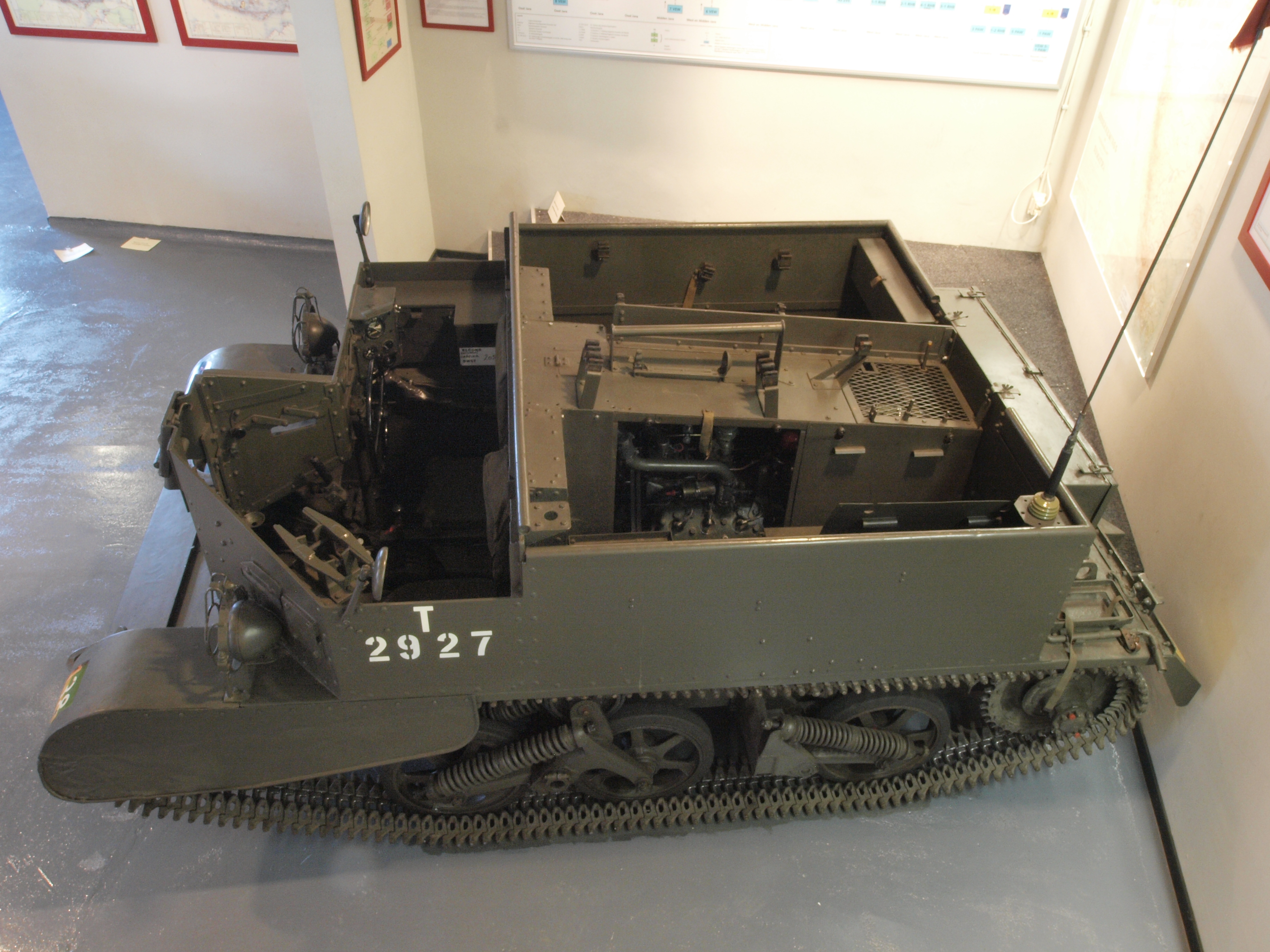
The sidevalve Ford engine was in the centre of the vehicle with the final drive at the rear.

The carrier put the driver and commander at the front sitting side by side; the driver to the right. The Ford V8 sidevalve engine with four speed gearbox was placed in the centre of the vehicle with the final drive (a commercial Ford axle) at the rear. The suspension and running gear were based on that used on the Vickers light tank series using Horstmann springs. Directional control was through a vertical steering wheel which pivoted about a horizontal axis. Small turns moved the crosstube that carried the front road wheel bogies laterally, warping the track so the vehicle drifted to that side. Further movement of the wheel braked the appropriate track to give a tighter turn.

The hull in front of the commander's position jutted forward to give room for the Bren light machine gun (or other armaments) to fire through a simple slit. To either side of the engine was an area in which passengers could sit or stores could be carried. Initially, there were several types of Carrier that varied slightly in design according to their purpose: "Medium Machine Gun Carrier" (the Vickers machine gun), "Bren Gun Carrier", "Scout Carrier" and "Cavalry Carrier". The production of a single model came to be preferred and the Universal design appeared in 1940; this was the most widely produced of the carriers. It differed from the previous models in that the rear section of the body had a rectangular shape, with more space for the crew.

== Production ==
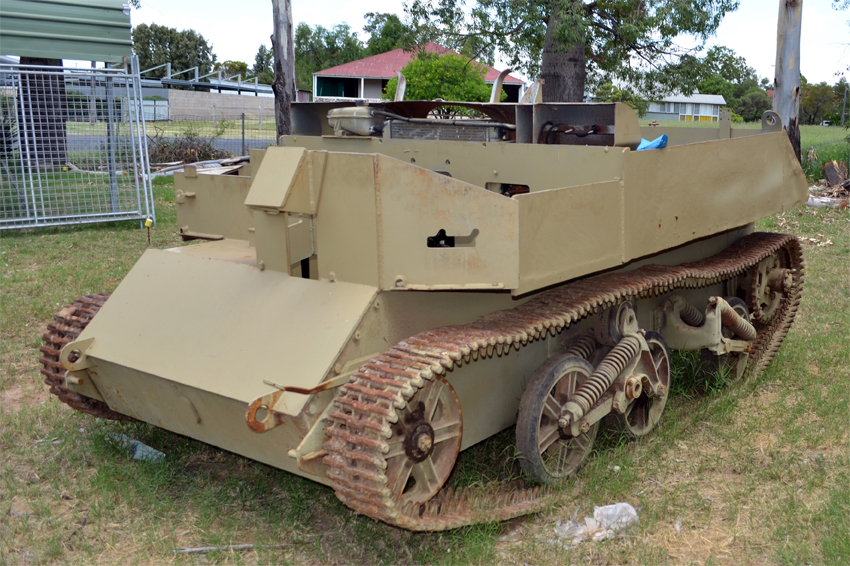
Australian-built machine gun carrier

Production of carriers began in 1934 and ended in 1960. Before the Universal design was introduced, the vehicles were produced by Aveling and Porter, Bedford Vehicles, Ford of Britain, Morris Motors Limited, the Sentinel Waggon Works, and the Thornycroft company. With the introduction of the Universal, production in the UK was undertaken by Aveling-Barford, Ford, Sentinel, Thornycroft, and Wolseley Motors. By 1945 production amounted to approximately 57,000 of all models, including some 2,400 early ones.

The Universal Carriers, in different variants, were also produced in allied countries. Ford Motor Company of Canada manufactured about 29,000 vehicles known as the Ford C01UC Universal Carrier. Smaller numbers of them were also produced in Australia (about 5,000), where hulls were made in several places in Victoria and by South Australian Railways workshops in Adelaide, South Australia. About 1,300 were also produced in New Zealand.

Universal Carriers were manufactured in the United States for allied use with GAE and GAEA V-8 Ford engines. About 20,000 were produced.

== Operational history ==
The Universal Carrier was ubiquitous in all the theatres during the Second World War with British and Commonwealth armies, from the war in the East to the occupation of Iceland. Although the theory and policy was that the carrier was a "fire power transport" and the crew would dismount to fight, practice differed. It could carry machine guns, anti-tank rifles, mortars, infantrymen, supplies, artillery and observation equipment.

=== United Kingdom ===
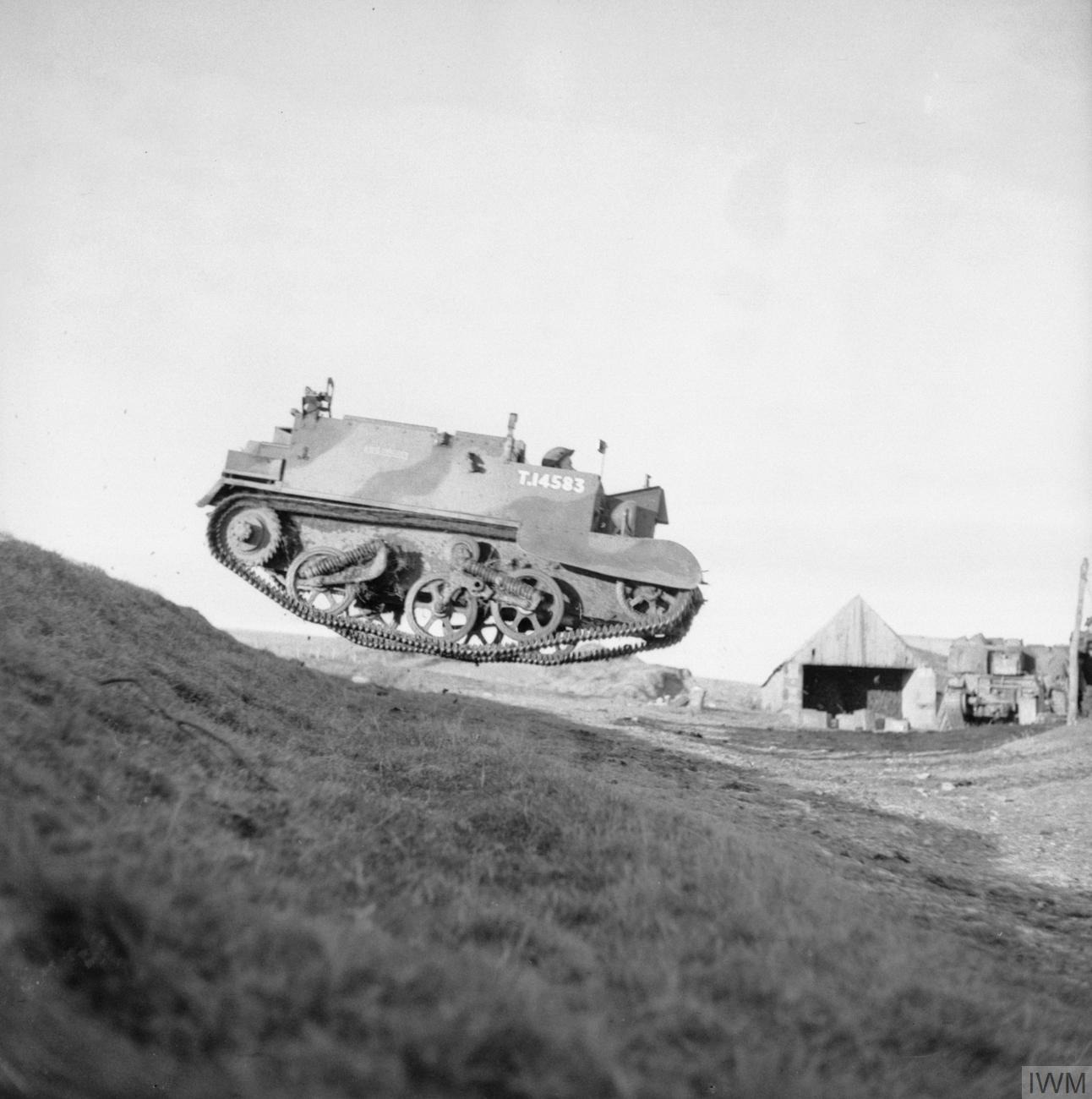
A Universal Carrier of 52nd Reconnaissance Regiment catches air on manoeuvres, Scotland, 10 November 1942

The seven mechanized divisional cavalry regiments in the British Expeditionary Force (BEF) in France during 1939–1940 were equipped with Scout Carriers – 44 carriers and 28 light tanks in each regiment. There were 10 Bren Carriers in each infantry battalion in the same period.

The Reconnaissance Corps regiments – which replaced the cavalry regiments in supporting Infantry divisions after 1940 – were each equipped with 63 carriers, along with 28 Humber scout cars.

Universal Carriers were issued to the support companies in infantry rifle battalions for carrying support weapons (initially 10, 21 by 1941, and up to 33 per battalion by 1943). A British armoured division of 1940–41 had 109 carriers; each motor battalion had 44.

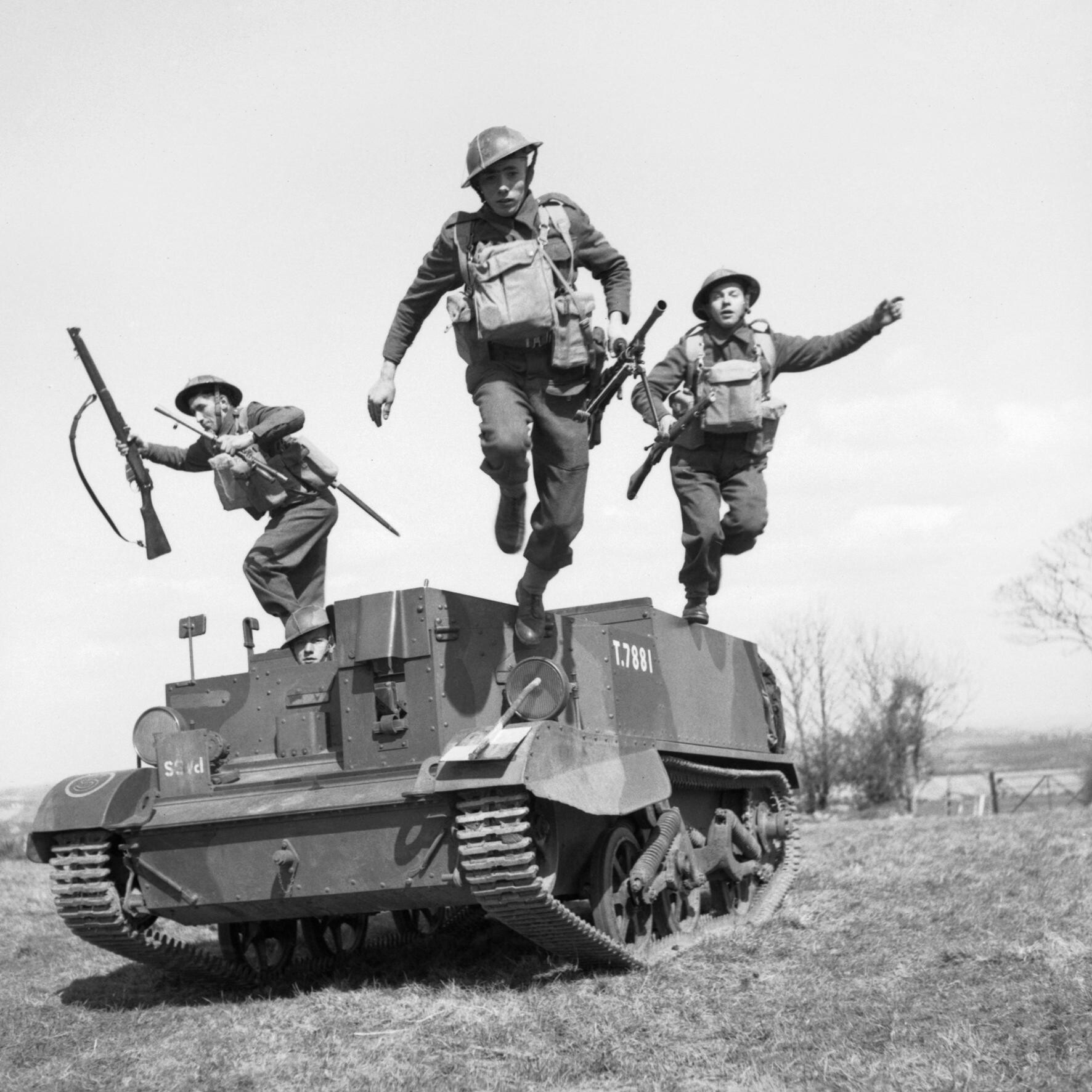
Monmouthshire Regiment soldiers leaping from their Universal Carrier during an exercise near Newry, 1941

A British Carrier platoon originally had ten Universal Carriers with three carrier sections of three Universal Carriers each plus another Universal Carrier in the platoon HQ (along with a 15-cwt GS truck). Each Universal Carrier had a non-commissioned officer (NCO), a rifleman and a driver-mechanic. One Universal Carrier in each section was commanded by a sergeant, the other two by corporals.

All the Universal Carriers were armed with a Bren gun and one carrier in each carrier section also had a Boys anti-tank rifle. By 1941, the carrier platoon had increased in strength to contain four carrier sections; one carrier in each carrier section also carried a 2-inch mortar.

By 1943, each Universal Carrier had a crew of four, an NCO, driver-mechanic and two riflemen. The Boys anti-tank rifle was also replaced by the PIAT anti-tank weapon. The Universal Carrier's weapons could be fired from in- or outside the carrier. A carrier platoon had a higher number of light support weapons than a rifle company.

Carrier section composition (after 1943)
Task	Rank	Weapon	Notes
Orderly	Private	Sten	Equipped with a motorcycle
Carrier 1
Commander	Sergeant	Rifle	
Driver-mechanic	Private	Rifle	
Gunner	Private	Bren	
Rifleman	Lance corporal	Rifle	No.38 Wireless set
Carrier 2
Commander	Corporal	Rifle	
Driver-mechanic	Private	Rifle	
Gunner	Private	Bren	
Rifleman	Private	Rifle	2-inch mortar with 36 rounds
Carrier 3
Commander	Corporal	Rifle	
Driver-mechanic	Private	Rifle	
Gunner	Private	Bren	
Rifleman	Private	Rifle and PIAT	

To allow the Universal to function as an artillery tractor in emergencies, a towing attachment that could allow it to haul the Ordnance QF 6 pounder anti-tank gun was added from 1943. Normally the Loyd Carrier – which was also used as a general utility carrier – acted as the tractor for the 6-pdr.

In Motorised Infantry Battalions in the British Army of the Rhine (BAOR) in the early 1950s the Universal was issued one per platoon carrying the Platoon Commander, driver, signaller and the 2-inch Mortar group Nos 1 & 2.

=== Australia ===
Universal and the earlier Bren carriers were used by Australian Army units in the Western Desert campaign.

Australian Universal Carriers were deployed to the Western Desert, Egypt during August 1942 serving as command vehicles for the 9th Divisional Cavalry Regiment.

=== Germany ===
Captured Universal Carriers were used in various roles by German forces.

A total of around sixty Bren No.2 Carriers and Belgian Army Vickers Utility Tractors were converted into demolition vehicles. Carrying a large explosive charge, these would be driven up to enemy positions under remote control and detonated, destroying both themselves and the target. Twenty-nine of both kinds were deployed in 1942 during the Siege of Sevastopol. They achieved some success in destroying Soviet trenches and bunkers, but a significant number were destroyed by artillery. Others were disabled by land mines before reaching their target or were lost because of mechanical breakdowns. A difficulty for the Germans using these foreign-built vehicles was the lack of spare parts.

== Variants ==
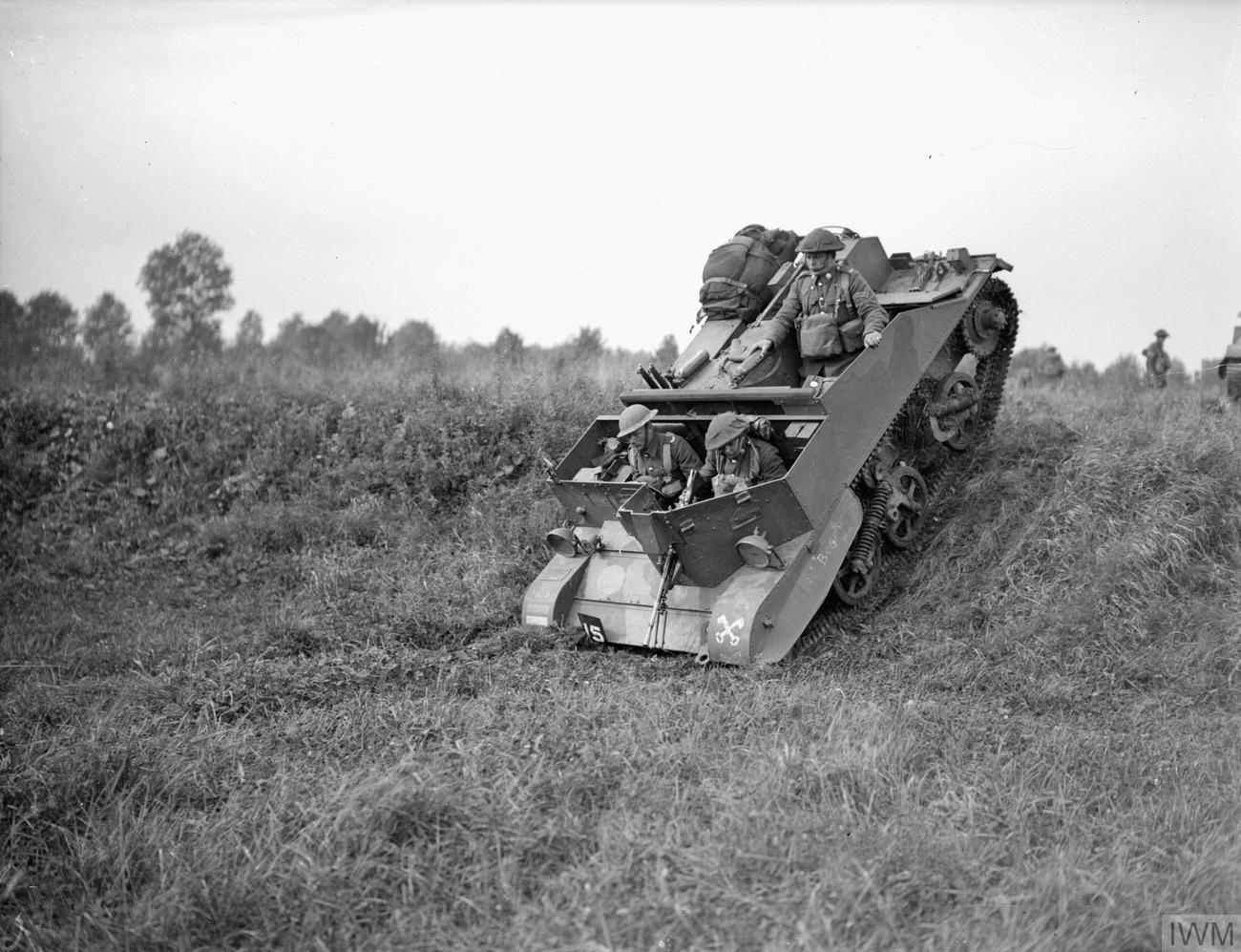
Bren Carrier No.2. The earlier carriers had much less armour than the Universal. In this case only one side behind the driver protected with a sloping plate.

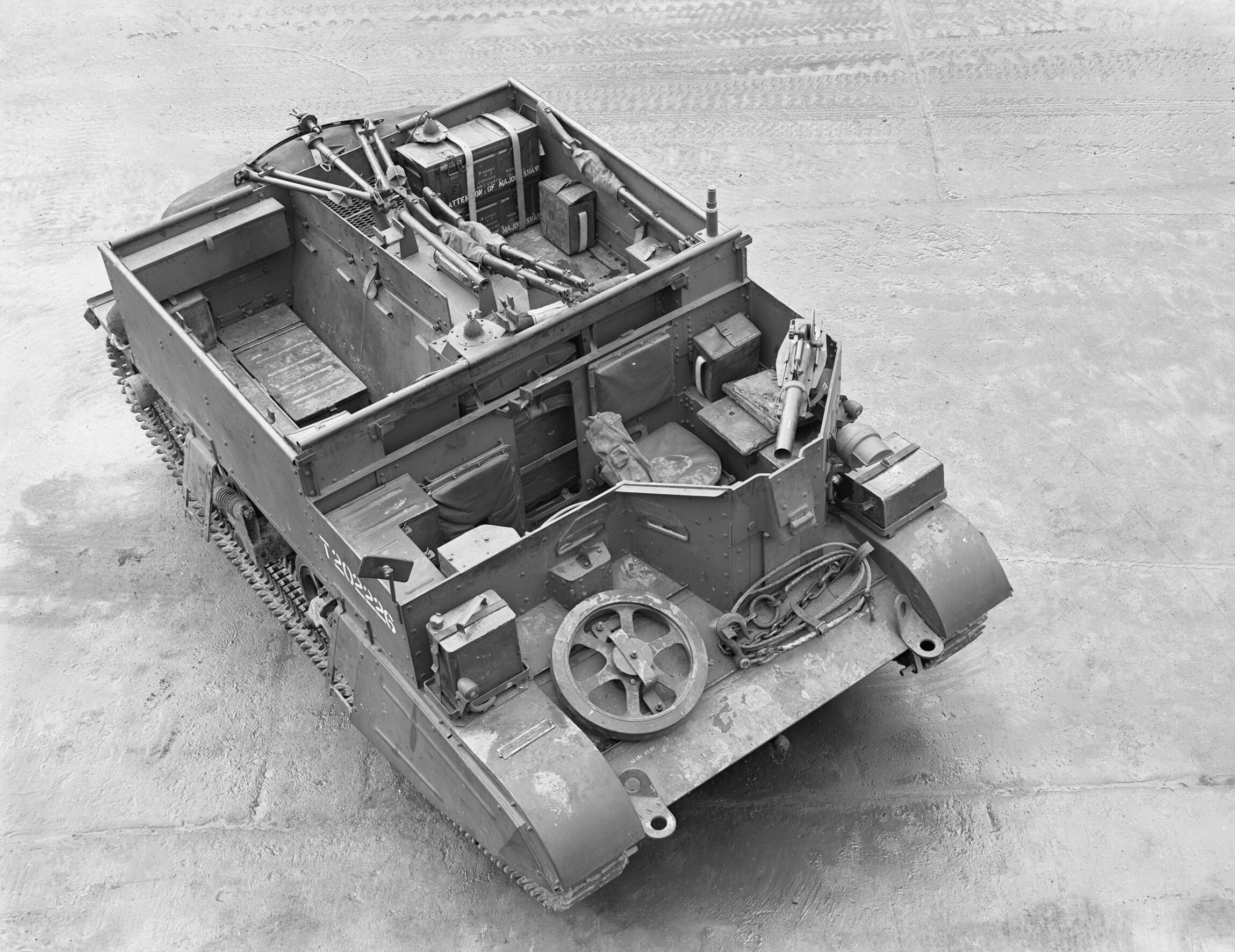
Universal Carrier Mk II

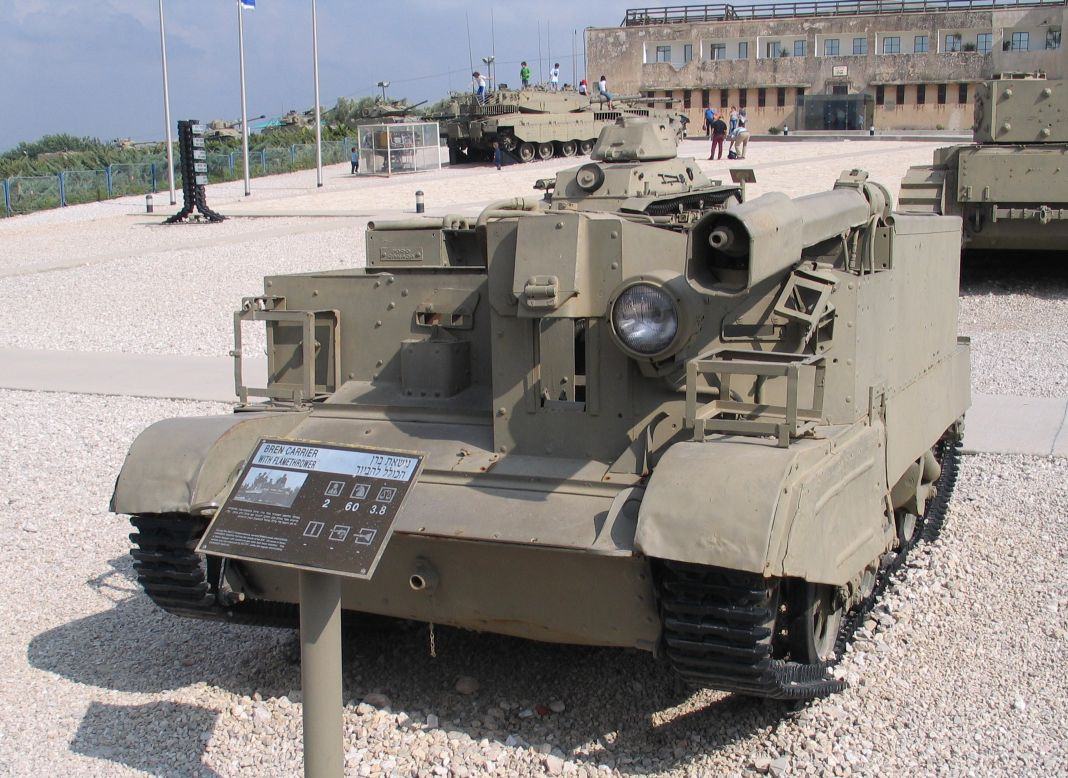
Flamethrower-equipped universal carrier at the Israeli Armored Corps museum in Latrun

The widespread production of the Carrier allowed for several variants to be developed, manufactured and/or used by different countries.

=== Argentine ===
An attempted conversion to self-propelled artillery consisting of a single T16 carrier fitted with a six-Model 1968 recoilless gun mount was developed in the late 1960s or early 1970s.

=== British ===
==== Early variants ====
- Carrier, Machine-Gun No. 2

Introduced in 1937 The Vickers machine gun was in an armoured housing and the third crewman was given an armoured backrest. First vehicles were built by Vickers-Armstrong but then production was carried on by Thornycroft, Morris, Aveling Barford, and Sentinel Wagon

- Carrier, Bren No.2, Mark I and Mark II

Modification of the Carrier Machine Gun No.2 design by Thornycroft for the Bren machine gun. Seating for three crew. Armour plate on front and left hand side only.

- Carrier, Scout Mk 1

Carried a No. 11 Wireless set. Armour plate on front and right hand side only. Batteries for the radio in bullet proof box over rear axle. Added screening to engine cover to limit radio interference.

- Carrier, Cavalry Mk 1

Used for carrying personnel of Light tank regiments in Mobile Divisions. A total of 50 were built by Nuffield, discontinued with the reorganization of the Mobile Divisions into Armoured divisions. Seating was provided for six passengers on benches.

- Carrier, Armoured Observation Post

For carrying Royal Artillery observers under protection. The machine gun position was fitted with an armoured shutter instead of gun slit. Ninety-five built in two marks.

- Carrier, Armoured, 2-pounder (40 mm)

A Carrier, Machine Gun converted in 1938 to mount a 2-pdr anti-tank gun with fixed armoured shield protecting the crew of four.

- Carrier, Armoured 6-pounder (57 mm)

A Carrier, Machine Gun converted to mount a 6-pdr gun with fixed armoured shield protecting the crew.

In addition, the Experimental Machine-Gun Carrier was rebuilt as the "General Service Vehicle" with a Boys anti-tank rifle on a rail allowing it to be swung from the front to aim to the sides. A Bren Gun Carrier was also rebuilt - probably at Ford Dagenham for a local Home Guard unit - with a Smith Gun, a 3-inch smoothbore gun firing antipersonnel or anti tank projectiles, in the hull front giving rise to a self-propelled gun

==== Later variants ====
Universal Mk. I
Initial model.
Universal Mk. II
Updated stowage and layout, battery moved behind the divisional plate, towing hitch added. Welded waterproofed hull. Crew of four. 2-inch mortar or 4-inch smoke mortar beside gunner. Spare wheel on front hull. Weighed 1/2 ton more than Mark I.
Universal Mk. III
Welded hull as Mark II, modified air inlet and engine cover.
Wasp (FT, Transportable, No. 2)
A flamethrower-equipped variant, using the "Flame-thrower, Transportable, No 2". The Mark I had a fixed flamethrower on the front of the vehicle fed from two fuel tanks with a combined capacity of 100 imperial gallons (450 L). 1000 produced. The Mk II had the projector in the co-driver's position. The Mk IIC (C for Canadian) had a single 75 imperial gallons (340 L) fuel tank on the rear of the vehicle outside the armour protection, allowing a third crew member to be carried. Many Wasp variants were fitted out at No.71 Factory in Stoke-on-Trent (Note: the premises that after the war became Rists Wire and Cables. No.71 Factory also repaired 20mm Hispano cannons during WWII)

==== Praying Mantis ====
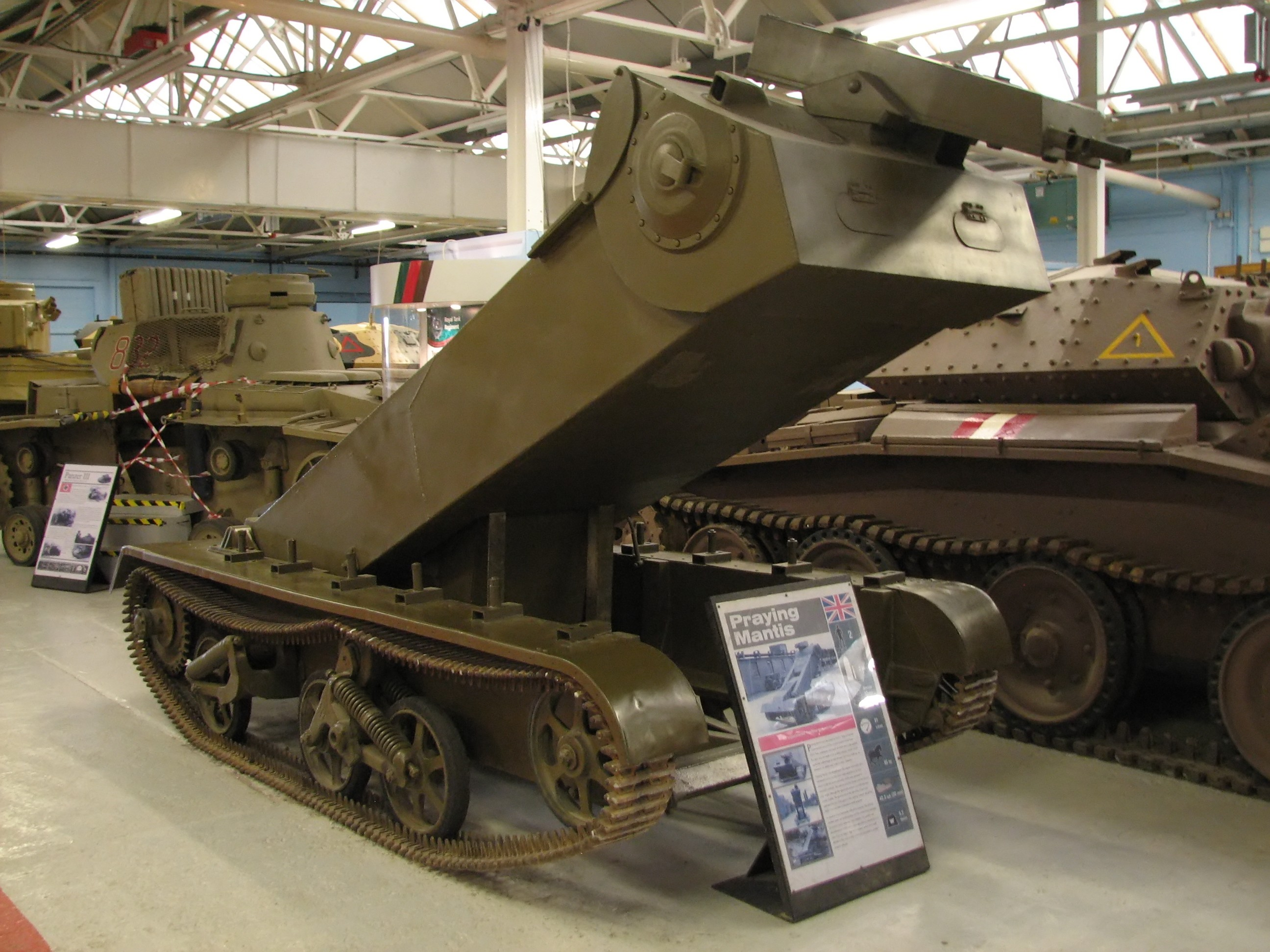
Praying Mantis prototype at The Tank Museum

The Praying Mantis came from an attempt to produce a low-silhouette vehicle that could still fire over obstacles. The idea came from a First World War machine gun officer. A one-man design based on Carden Loyd suspension was built at the urging of retired Major-General Swinton, (Colonel Commandant of the Royal Tank Corps), and trialled in 1939, but the inventor was encouraged to design a two-man version by General Martel (formerly the Assistant Director of Mechanisation at the War Office). Design proceeded but this version was not built until 1943, by County Commercial Cars Ltd, using Universal Carrier parts. The hull was replaced with an enclosed metal-box structure with enough room for a driver and a gunner lying prone. This box, pivoting from the rear, could be elevated. At the top end was a machine-gun turret (with two Bren guns). The intention was to drive the Mantis up to a wall or hedgerow, elevate the gun, and fire over the obstacle from a position of safety. It was rejected after trials in 1944. An example of the Mantis is preserved in The Tank Museum.

=== Australian ===
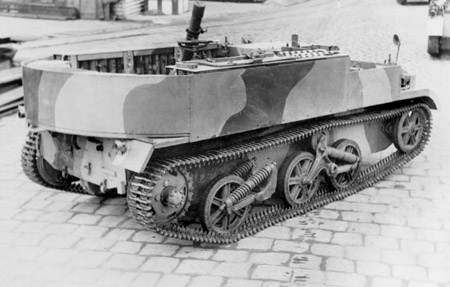
An Australian 3 inch mortar carrier

- Carrier, Machine Gun, Local Pattern, No. 1

Also known as "LP1 Carrier (Aust)". Australian production similar to Bren carrier but welded and some minor differences.

- Universal Carrier MG, Local Pattern No. 2

Also known as "LP2 Carrier (Aust)". Australian-built variant of the Universal Carrier. Also produced in New Zealand. Used 1938–1939 Ford commercial axles; the 2A had 1940 Ford truck axles.

- 2-pounder Anti-tank Gun Carrier (Aust) or Carrier, 2-pdr Tank Attack

A heavily modified and lengthened LP2 carrier with a fully traversable QF 2 pounder (40 mm) anti-tank gun mounted on a platform at the rear and the engine moved to the front left of the vehicle. Stowage was provided for 112 rounds of 2pdr ammunition. 200 were produced and used for training.

- 3 inch Mortar Carrier (Aust)

A design based on the 2 Pounder Carrier with a 3-inch (81 mm) mortar mounted in place of the 2 pounder. Designed to enable the mortar to have 360 degree traverse and to be fired either from the vehicle, or dismounted. 400 were produced and were ultimately sent as military aid to the Nationalist Chinese Army.

=== Canadian ===
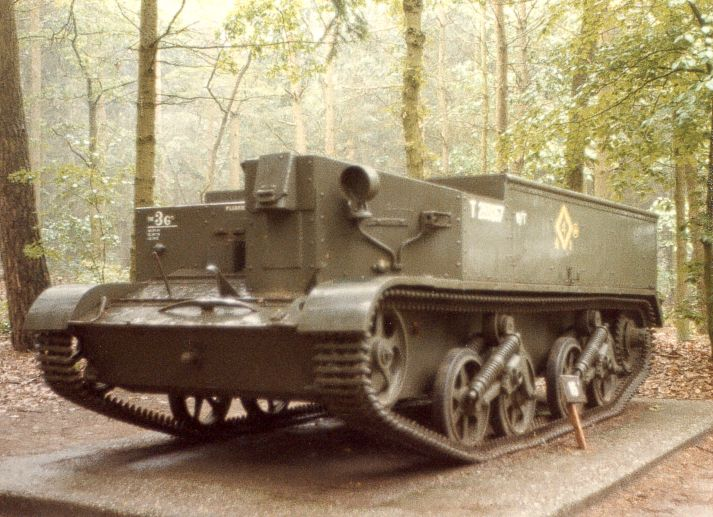
Windsor carrier, Overloon Museum

"Carrier, Universal No.3"
- Mk.I* (certain differences, otherwise similar to British model)
- Mk.II* (certain differences, otherwise similar to British model)
- Mk.II*
Carrier, 2-pdr Equipped
Canadian modification of Mark I* and II* to mount 2-pdr gun. 213 used for training.
Wasp Mk II*
Canadian version of the Wasp flamethrower variant.
Windsor Carrier
Canadian development with a longer chassis extended by 76 cm (30 in) and an additional wheel in the aft bogie.

=== American ===
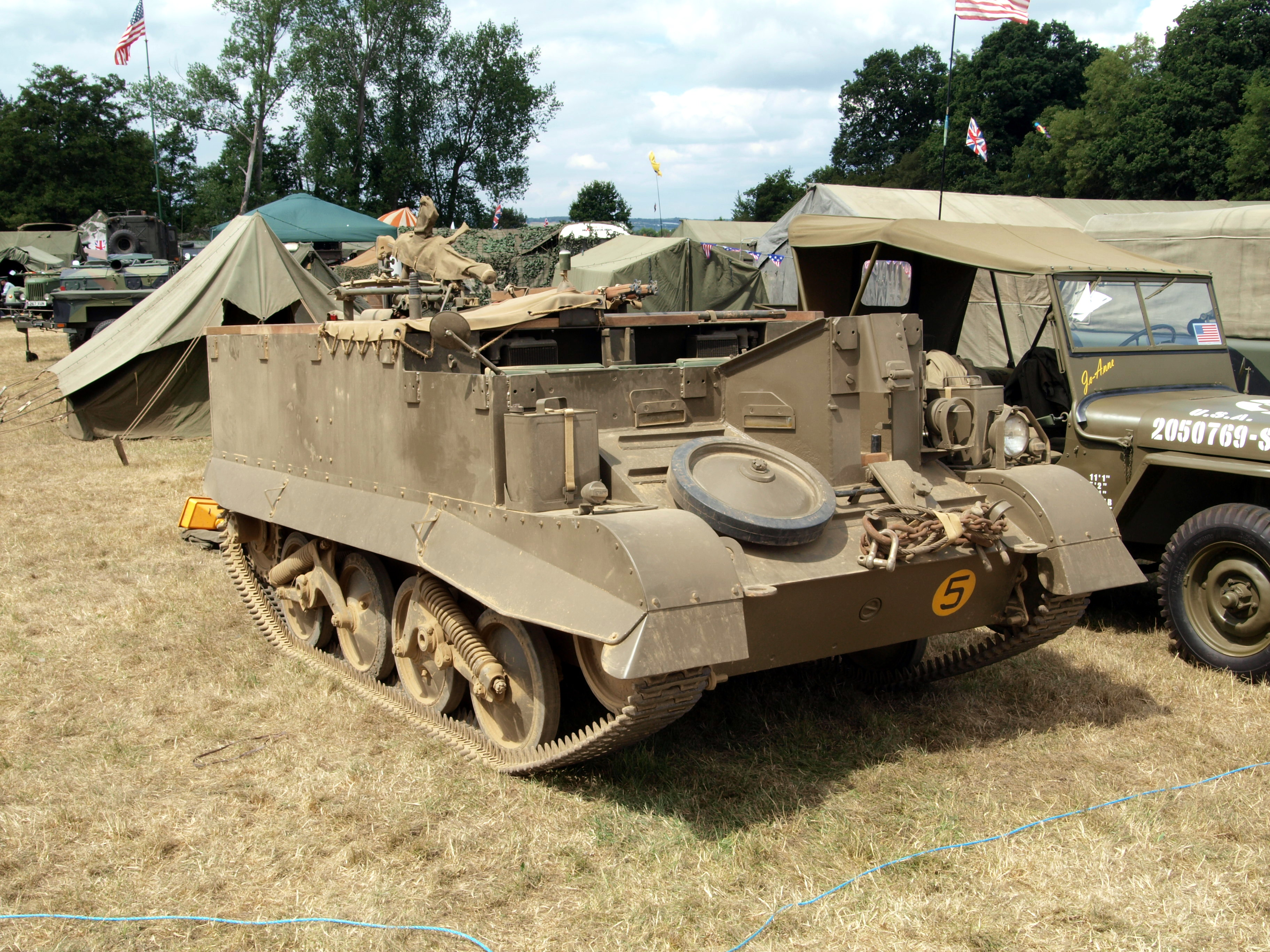
T16 carrier

American production of the Universal followed the same design as the British Marks I to III

- Carrier, Universal No.2 Mark I - Ford GAEA engine
- Carrier, Universal No.2A Mark I - Ford GAE engine
- Carrier, Universal No.2 Mark II - Ford GAE engine
- Carrier, Universal No.2A Mark II - Ford GAEA engine
- Carrier, Universal No.2 Mark III - Ford GAE engine
- Carrier, Universal No.2A Mark III - Ford GAEA engine

T-16
The Carrier, Universal, T16, Mark I., initially "Cargo Carrier T16" was the result of US experimentation in 1942 to improve on the Universal for British use and for US in the Pacific war. It was a significantly improved vehicle based upon those built by Ford of Canada, manufactured under Lend Lease by Ford in the United States from March 1943 to 1945. At 155 in (3.9 m) it was longer than the Universal with an extra road wheel on the rear bogie; making for a pair of full Horstmann dual-wheel suspension units per side, the engine was a Mercury-division 239 version (GAU370) of the Ford V8 delivering the same power. Instead of the steering wheel controlling the combination brake/warp mechanism, the T-16 used track-brake steering operated by levers (two for each side). The British were supplied with over 3,200 in 1944-1945 but it was considered mechanically unreliable and had less carrying capacity than the Universal. During the war, it was chiefly used by Canadian forces as an artillery tractor. After the war, was used by Argentine, Swiss (300) and Dutch forces.

=== German ===
- 2 cm Flak 38 auf Fahrgestell Bren(e): Single barrel German 2 cm Flak 38 cannon mounted over the engine compartment of a captured Bren carrier.
- 3.7 cm Pak auf Fahrgestell Bren(e): Captured carrier of 1940, reused by the Germans and fitted with a 3.7 cm Pak 36 anti-tank gun.
- 4,7 cm Pak 35/36 L/35.6 (ö) “Böhler” auf Sfl. Bren(e): Captured Bren carrier mounting a 4,7 cm Pak 35/36 L/35.6 (ö) “Böhler” (same gun as Cannone da 47/32 ). Created by Baukommando Becker.
- Panzerjäger Bren 731(e): Bren carriers captured by the Germans and fitted with a transport rack for three Panzerschreck anti-tank rocket launchers; the weapons were not fired from the Bren gun carrier, only transported.

=== Italian ===
In 1942, at the request of the Italian Army (Regio Esercito), Fiat produced a prototype carrier copied from a captured Universal Carrier; it was known as the Fiat 2800 or CVP-4. It is uncertain whether production vehicles were manufactured. Bren carriers captured by the Italians in the field were often fitted with Breda M37 machine guns.

== Operators ==
Many variants of the British Universal Carrier have been fielded and used by the armed forces of the following countries, amongst many others:

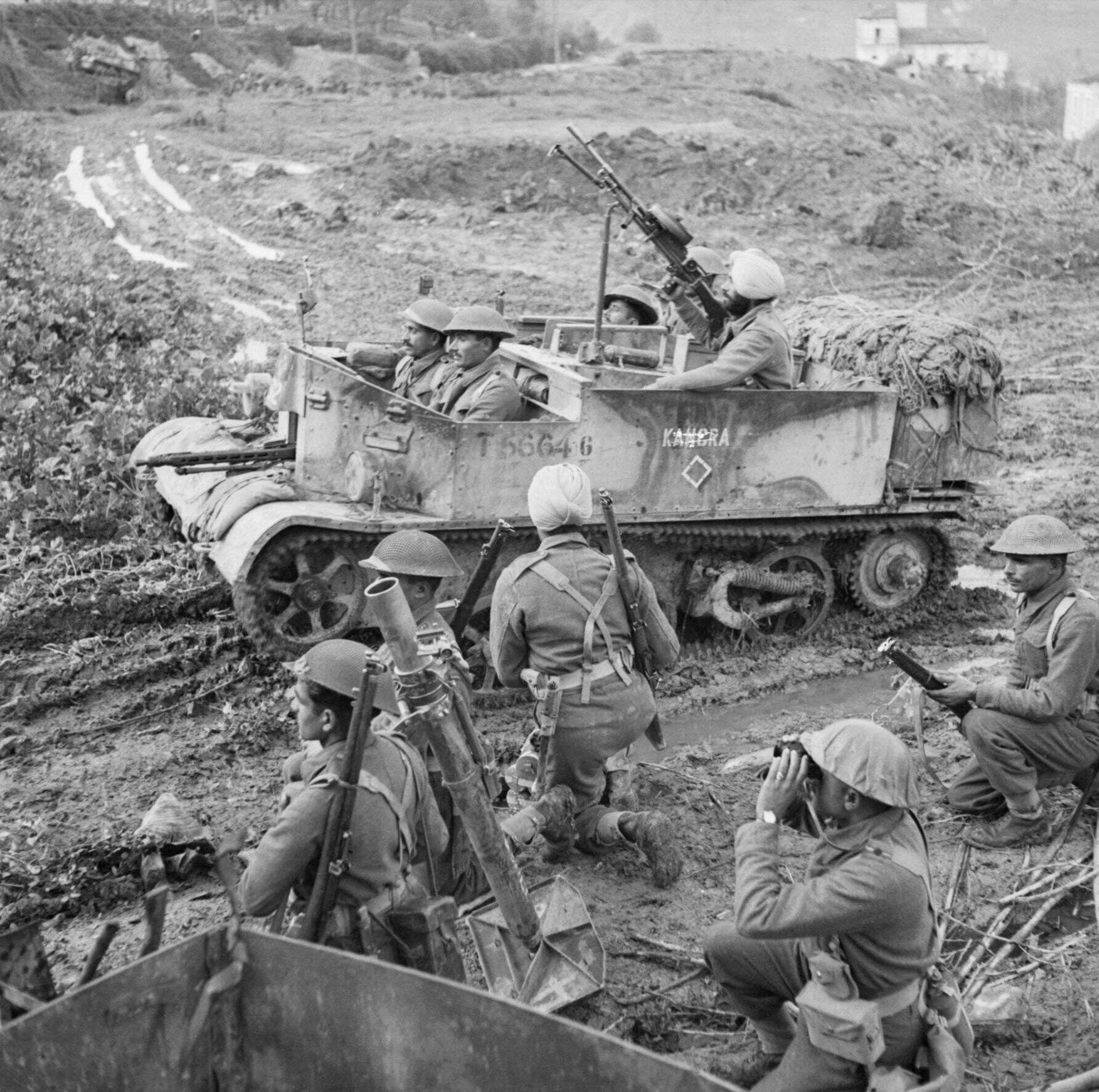
Universal Carrier, 13th Frontier Force Rifles British Indian Army, in Italy, 13 December 1943.

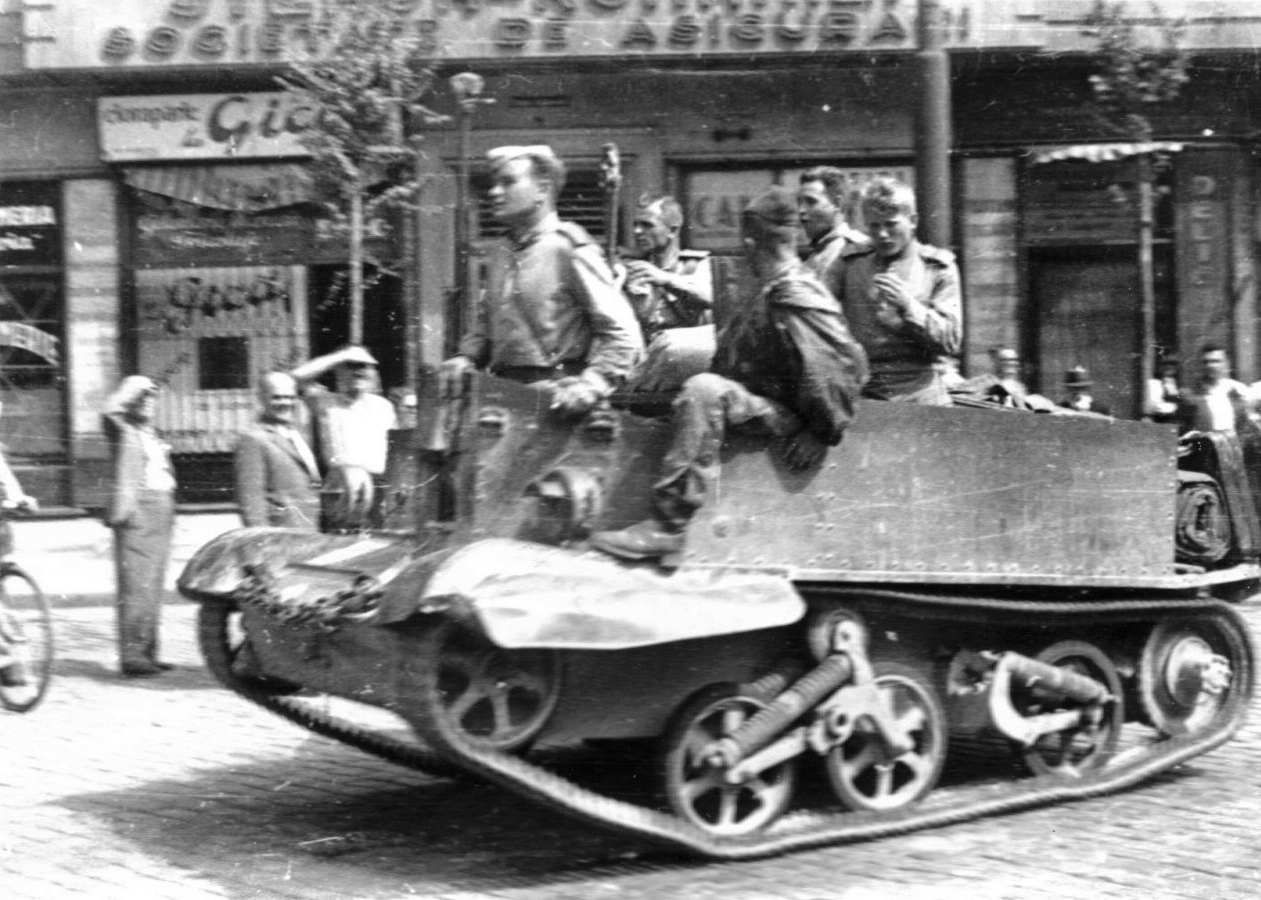
Soviet Red Army soldiers travelling on a British Universal Carrier received from the UK under the Lend-Lease programme near Boulevard of Carol I in the Romanian capital of Bucharest in August 1944.

=== Pre-war/Second World War period ===
- Australia
- Belgium (used by in-exile Belgian forces in the Middle Eastern regions during the war, after the country was invaded and occupied by Nazi Germany in 1940)
- Canada
- China: 1,500 UCs supplied by Australia during the war, with a sizeable number of these (about 400) being 3-inch mortar-carrier versions. The pro-Japanese Collaborationist Chinese Army also received carriers captured in Singapore by the Japanese.
- Czechoslovakia Mk.Is used by Czechoslovak battalion 11 in the Middle East, Mk.Is, Mk.IIs, Mk.IIIs, Mortars used by Czechoslovak Independent Armoured Brigade in UK and Western Europe, 15 UCs Mk.II received from the USSR - served in I Corps of the Czechoslovak Army-in-exile on the Eastern Front)
- France: used by Free French Forces
- Nazi Germany (by the German Wehrmacht, which operated a small number of carriers captured mainly from the UK)
- Japan: captured vehicles, many of them seized after the capture of Singapore.
- Greece (fielded by Free Greek troops following the country's fall to Nazi German occupation in the Middle East, like the exiled Belgian military forces)
- Azad Hind: The Indian National Army received carriers captured by Japan after the fall of Singapore.
- Ireland: 26 Mk. I carriers received in 1940 and 200 Mk. II carriers from 1943 to 1945. Still in service in the 1960s.
- Kingdom of Italy: a few captured UCs used by the Regio Esercito unit of the Italian Army and one locally produced copy (the Fiat 2800)
- Dutch government-in-exile: used by the Royal Netherlands Motorized Infantry Brigade.
- Philippines: operated by the Second Regular Division during the Battle of Bataan.
- Poland: operated by the in-exile Polish Armed Forces in the West
- Portugal: the Portuguese Army received more than 178 universal carriers from 1942.
- United Kingdom (the main operator in WWII)
- United States (57 UCs en route for Canadian troop units in Hong Kong were in the Philippines when the Japanese invaded both Hong Kong and the Philippines, with 40 UCs taken over and operated by the US 1st Provisional Tank Group)
- Soviet Union (received 200 before the end of 1941 and 2,560 Universal Carriers and similar Loyd Carriers starting from then until the end of WWII in 1945)
- Thailand (118 UCs operated in 1944, possibly supplied (covertly) by the UK)
- (Democratic Federal Yugoslavia) Yugoslav Partisans
- New Zealand

=== Post-war period ===
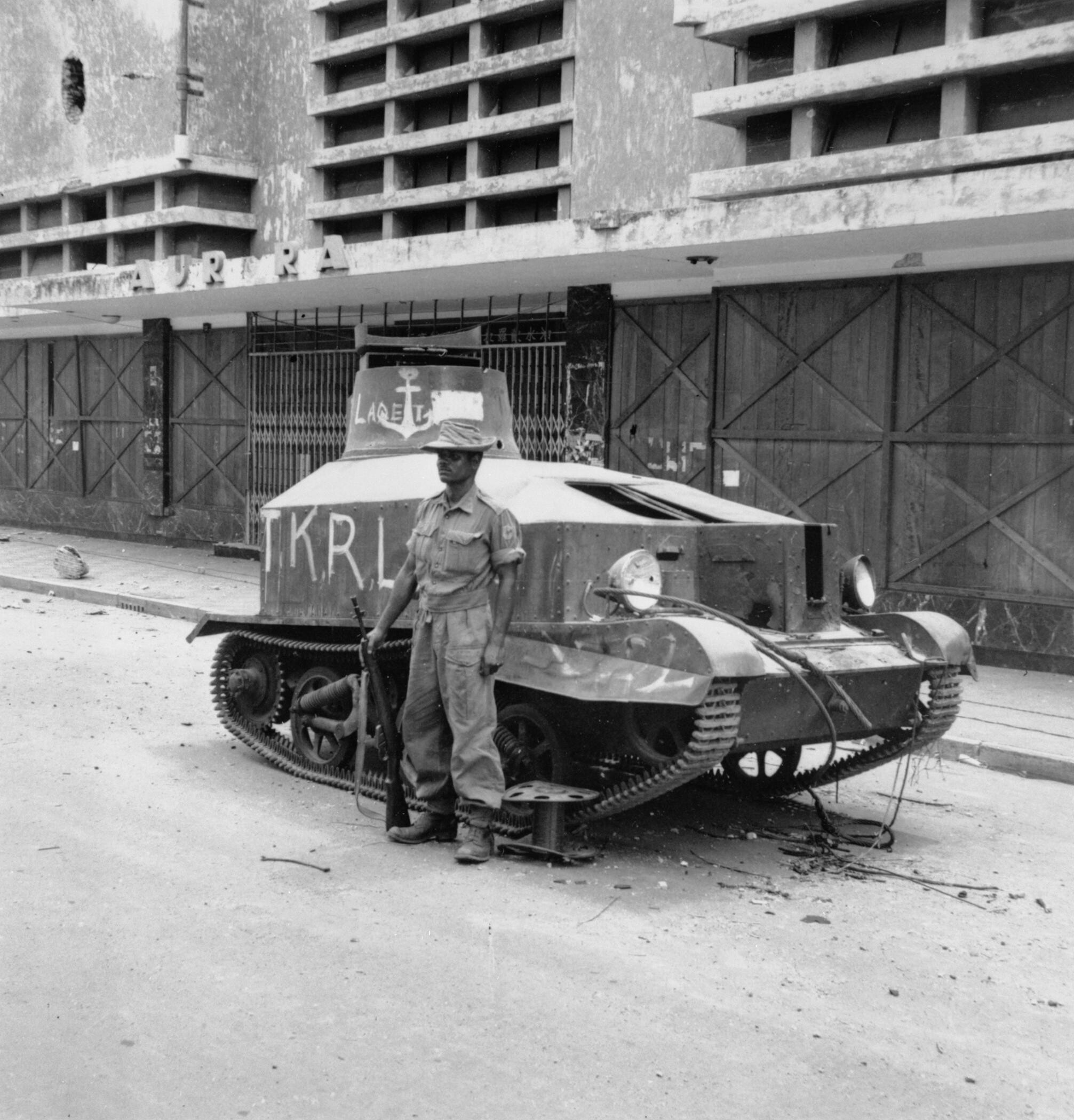
A British Indian soldier guarding a captured significantly-modified Universal Carrier, used by Indonesian TKR Laut (Note: Abbreviation of Tentara Keamanan Rakyat[-]Laut (Indonesian: People's Security Army Naval Branch), predecessor of the Indonesian Navy) forces during the Battle of Surabaya in November 1945

- Afghanistan
- Argentina (250, including T-16s, supplied by the UK between 1946 and 1950)
- Biafra (very likely obtained from a French trader, with some converted and modified locally with extra armour)
- Ceylon (former British stocks, which were retired from frontline service in the 1960s)
- Costa Rica
- Denmark (some were armed with a M40 recoilless rifle)
- Egypt (possibly provided by departing British forces from the Middle East)
- France (small numbers used by the French expeditionary corps, the CEFEO, fighting in Indochina)
- Indonesia (small numbers of ex-Japanese stocks were captured and used by the People's Security Army during the Battle of Surabaya)
- Israel (received many from withdrawing British troops in Palestine, aside from buying them from the scrapyards of various European countries after WWII and capturing them from Egypt between their conflicts)
- Kuwait (former British stocks, which were retired from frontline service in 1961)
- Federal Republic of Germany (the Bundeswehr received 100 ex-British UCs in 1956)
- The Netherlands: a number operated following WWII (possibly ex-British UCs), especially in the independence war in their former colony of Indonesia (the Dutch East Indies) between 1945 and 1949, as part of the Indonesian National Revolution. A small number were lost and subsequently taken over by the new Indonesian Republic's military.
- Pakistan: In the early years of the Pakistan Army it was used as a mortar carrier and for the basic training of tank crews.
- Sweden (at least two were unofficially used by Home Guard units during the 1950s)
- Switzerland (used and fielded predominantly US-built T16 versions of the Universal Carrier up until possibly the early 1960s)

== Gallery ==
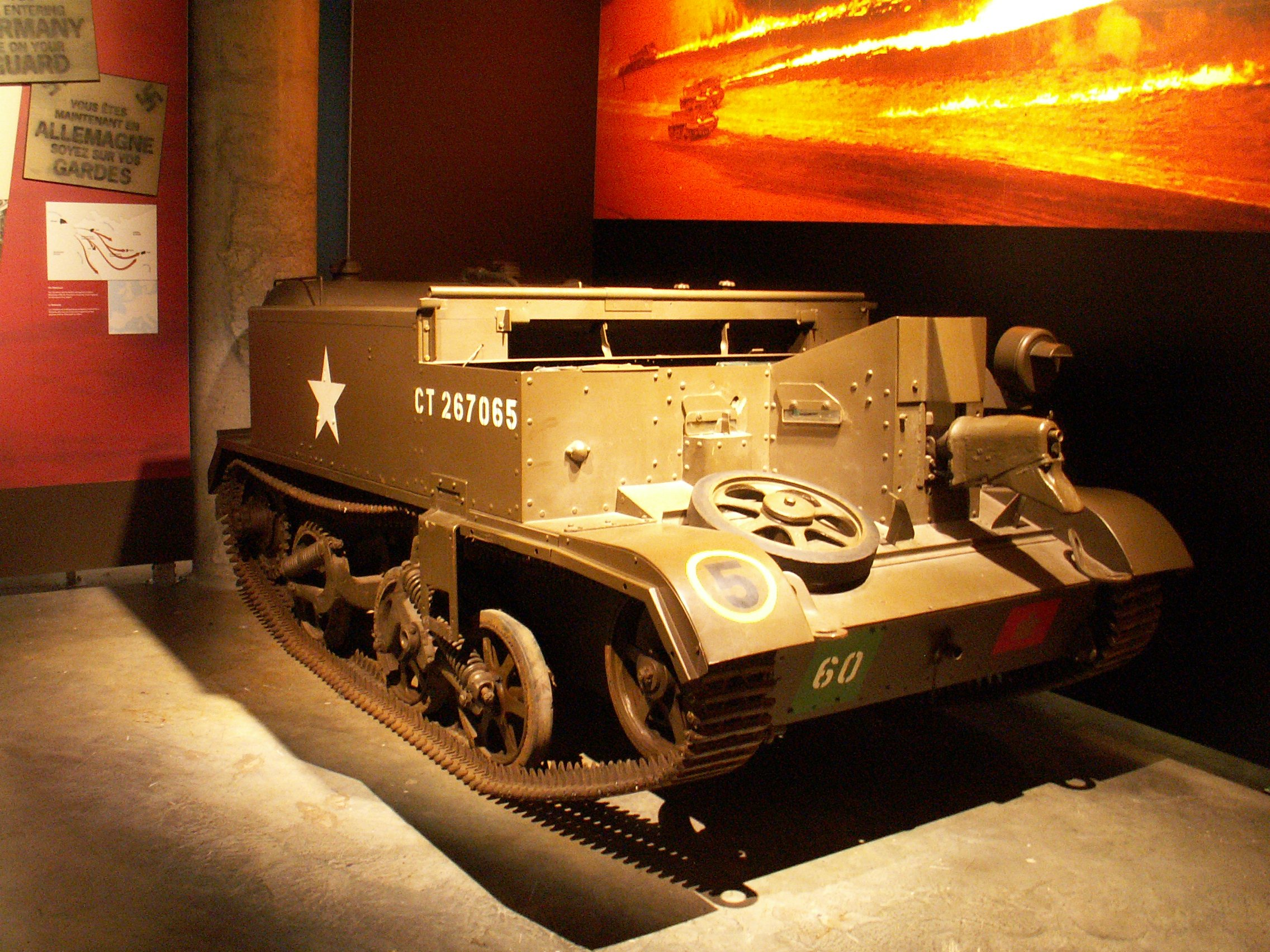
A Wasp flamethrower tank on display in the Canadian War Museum

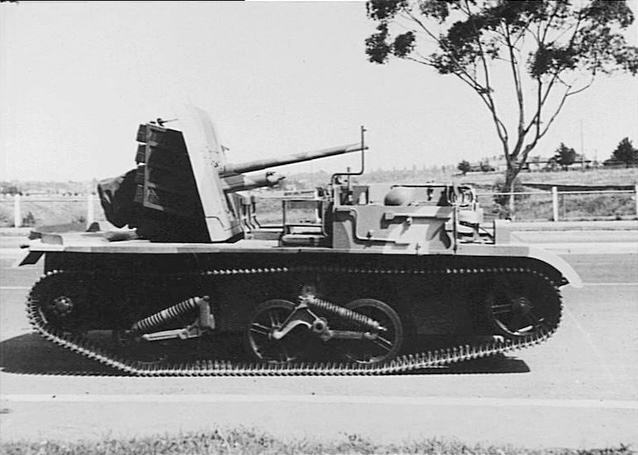
An Australian 2-pounder anti-tank gun UC variant

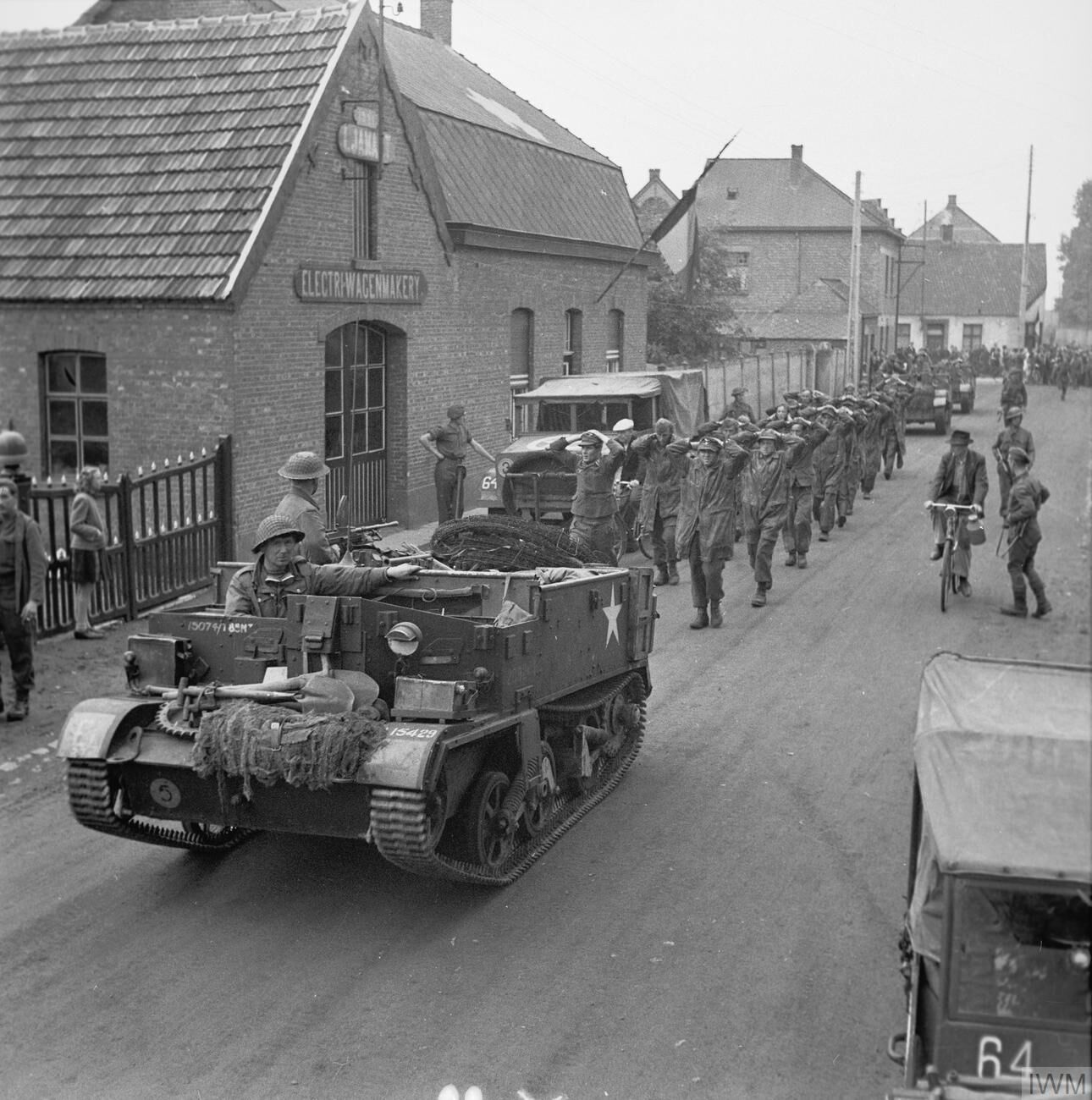
A British Army Universal Carrier leads some German prisoners-of-war into a Belgian town.

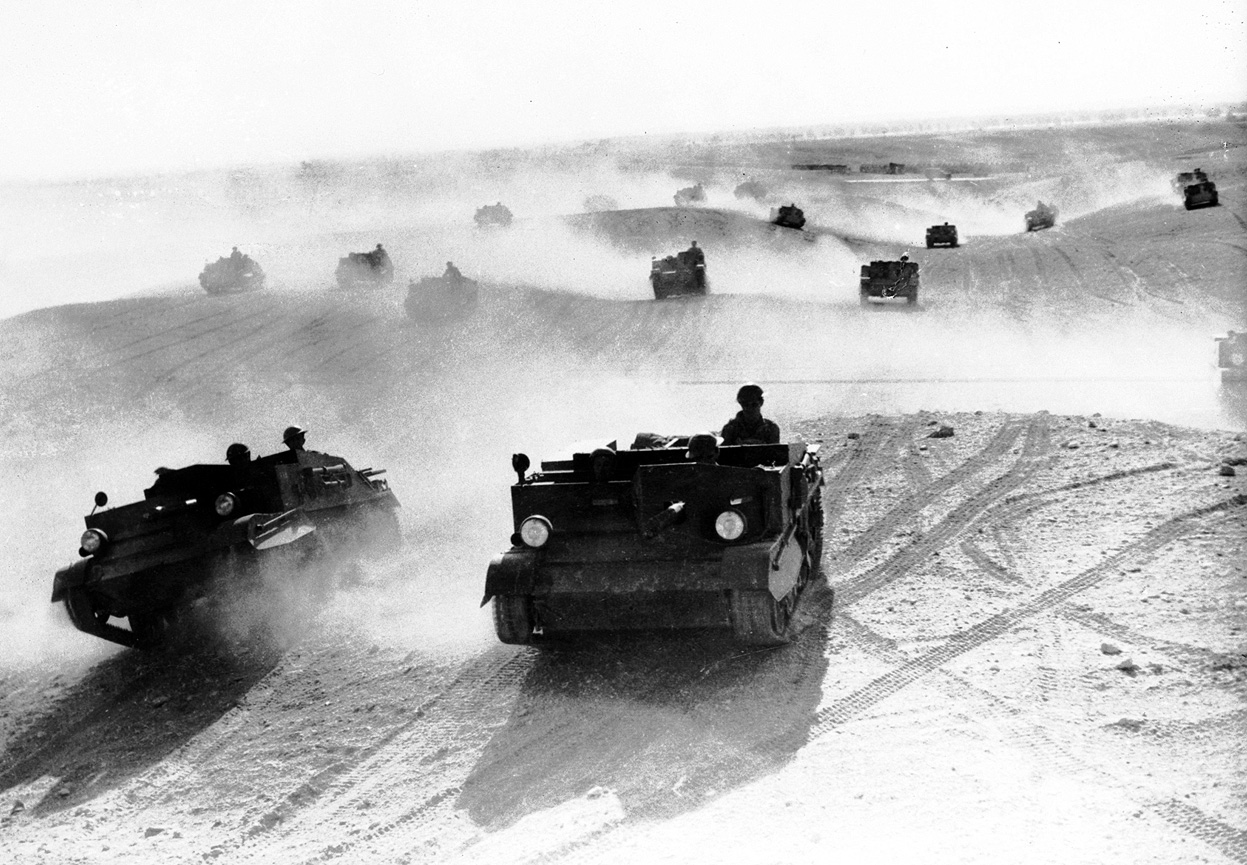
Australians driving Bren Carriers to Bardia, Libya, January 1941

== See also ==
- C2P – Polish light artillery tractor
- Kettenkrad – German military half track motorcycle
- Komsomolets armored tractor – Soviet artillery tractor
- Lorraine 37L – French tracked carrier
- Loyd Carrier – British armoured personnel carrier
- M29 Weasel – American light tracked vehicle
- Raupenschlepper Ost – German light tracked vehicle
- TKS – Polish tankette
