= Murphy (given name) =

- Pronunciation: US: /ˈmɜːrfi/ UK: /ˈmɜːfi/
- Gender: Unisex
- Language: English

Origin
- Languages: 1. Irish Gaelic; 2. English
- Origin: From the Irish surname, which was derived from the Irish personal name "Murchadh".
- Derivation: Irish: Murchadh
- Meaning: "Sea Warrior"
- Region of origin: Ireland

Other names
- Variant form: Murphey
- Short form: Murph
- Related names: Murchadh, Murdoch, Murdo

Murphy is a given name of Irish origin.

Notable people and characters with the name include:

== Men ==
- Murphy Akanji (born 1977), Nigerian footballer
- Murphy Anderson (1926–2015), American comics artist
- Murphy Bennett (born 2004), British footballer
- Murphy Cassone (born 2002), American tennis player
- Murphy Currie (1893–1939), American baseball player
- Murphy Dunne (born 1942), American actor and musician
- Murphy J. Foster (1849–1921), American politician
- Murphy James Foster Jr., known as Mike Foster (1930–2020), American businessman and politician
- Murphy Greenberg (1907–1984), American football player
- Murphy Guyer (born 1952), American actor, playwright, writer and director
- Murphy Holloway (born 1990), American basketball player
- Murphy Ijemba, Nigerian radio personality
- Murphy Jensen (born 1968), American tennis player and businessman
- Murphy Karges, Member group Sugar Ray
- Murphy Lee (born 1979/1980), American rapper
- Murphy Mahoney (born 2001), English footballer
- Murphy Morobe, South African anti-apartheid activist
- Murphy Nagbe (born 1984), Liberian footballer
- Murphy Pakiam (born 1938), Malaysian Catholic archbishop
- Murphy Reid (born 2006), Australian professional rules footballer
- Murphy O. Shewchuk, Canadian writer
- Murphy Smith (born 1987), American professional baseball pitcher
- Murphy Su'a (born 1966), New Zealand cricketer
- Murphy Taramai (born 1992), New Zealand rugby union player
- Murphy Tomlinson, American curler
- Murphy Troy (born 1989), American volleyball player
- Murphy Walker (born 1999), Scottish rugby union player
- Murphy Wiredu (born 1985), Canadian soccer player

== Women ==
- Murphy Agnew (born 1998), American soccer player
- Murphy Bromberg (born 1995), American diver
- Murphy Cross, American actress
- Murphy Claire Levesque (born 2008), daughter of Stephanie McMahon and Triple H
- Murphy Sheaff (born 2003), New Zealand soccer player

== Fictional characters ==
- Murphy Bellman, in the British TV series The Dumping Ground
- Murphy Brown, the title character from the TV show Murphy Brown played by Candice Bergen
- Murphy Cooper, in the film Interstellar (2014)
- Murphy MacManus, one of the two main characters from the movie The Boondock Saints
- Murphy Mason, the title character from the TV show In the Dark played by Perry Mattfeld
- Murphy Pendleton, the protagonist of the video game Silent Hill: Downpour
- the title character of Murphy, Samuel Beckett's first published novel

== See also ==
- Murphy (surname)
- Murphy (disambiguation)
