= Th-fronting =

Pronouncing "th" as "f" or "v"

Th-fronting is the pronunciation of English ⟨th⟩ as ⟨f⟩ or ⟨v⟩. When th-fronting is applied, [θ] becomes [f] or [ɸ] (for example, three is pronounced like free) and [ð] becomes [v] or [β] (for example, further is pronounced like furver). (Here "fronting" refers to the position in the mouth where the sound is produced, not the position of the sound in the word, with the "th" coming from the tongue as opposed to the "f" or "v" coming from the more-forward lower lip.) Unlike the fronting of [θ] to [f], the fronting of [ð] to [v] usually does not occur word-initially. For example, while further is pronounced as furver, that is rarely pronounced as *vat, although this was found in the speech of South-East London in a survey completed 1990–1994. Th-fronting is a prominent feature of several dialects of English, notably Cockney, Essex dialect, Estuary English, some West Country and Yorkshire dialects, Manchester English, African American Vernacular English, and Liberian English, as well as in many non-native English speakers (e.g. Hong Kong English, though the details differ among those accents).

== Uses ==
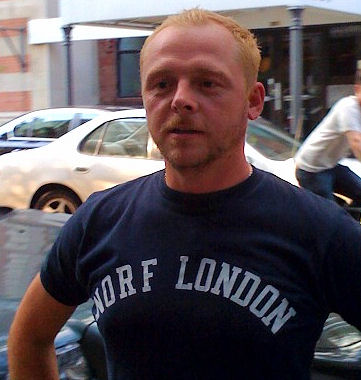
Actor Simon Pegg wearing a T-shirt with the slogan Norf London, representing "North London" with th-fronting

The first reference to th-fronting is in the "low English" of London in 1787, though only a single author in that century writes about it, and it was likely perceived as an idiosyncrasy, rather than a full-fledged dialect feature of Cockney English, even into the early half of the twentieth century. The feature was presumed to be reasonably common in London speakers born around 1850 and in Bristol by 1880. The use of the labiodental fricatives [f] and [v] for the dental fricatives [θ] and [ð] was noted in Yorkshire in 1876. In his 1892 book A Grammar of the Dialect of Windhill, Joseph Wright noted variable th-fronting in his district in words such as think, third and smithy.

In some words, th-fronting has been lexicalised. For example, the word without was lexicalised to wivoot in some dialects of Northern England and Scotland.

In the Survey of English Dialects of the 1950s and early 1960s, th-fronting was found in two main areas of England. One was the area around Bristol in the West Country. The other was in the area around London and Essex. It was also noted in the Suffolk dialect by AOD Claxton in 1968, albeit only for certain words (e.g. three and thumb but not thaw or thought).

Comparing his studies over time in Norwich, Peter Trudgill concluded that th-fronting had been completely absent in 1968 and then very common amongst younger people by 1983. Although th-fronting is found occasionally in the middle and upper (middle) class English accents as well, there is still a marked social difference between working and middle class speakers. Th-fronting is regarded as a 'boundary marker' between Cockney and Estuary English, as depicted in the first descriptions of the latter form of English and confirmed by a phonetic study conducted by researcher Ulrike Altendorf. Nevertheless, Altendorf points out that th-fronting is found occasionally in middle class (Estuary) speech as well and concludes that "it is currently making its way into the middle class English accent and thus into Estuary English".

In popular music, the singer Joe Brown's 1960s backing band was christened The Bruvvers (that is, "the brothers" with th-fronting). The 1960 musical Fings Ain't Wot They Used T'Be was stated to be a Cockney Comedy. Rock musician Keith Richards is commonly referred to as "Keef".

Up until the late 20th century, th-fronting was common in speakers of Australian English from North Brisbane and the Sunshine Coast of Queensland. This may stem from the relatively high number of London cockneys who settled there during the Queensland gold rushes of the 19th century. The practice is gradually dying out as the influx of interstate and international immigrants increases.

== Example ==
The following is a sample of a speaker of the Cockney accent who has th-fronting (affected words are in bold):

My dad came from Wapping and me mum came from Poplar. Me dad was one of eleven kids… and Wapping in them days really was one of the poorest parts of London. I mean they really didn't have shoes on their feet. I'm talking about seventy years ago now. Erm… and Poplar was… sli… just slightly a cut above Wapping; erm… you was either East End respectable or you was sort of East End villain, you know, and my family was respectable on both sides. But me father had a very tough time because his father died when he was nineteen, leaving him the only one working to bring up eleven brothers… ten brothers and sisters and on a Thursday night he'd sometimes go home and the youngest two would be crying in the corner and he'd say “What's the matter with them, ma?” “Oh, well, Harry, you know it's Thursday night, and you don't get paid till tomorrow.” and they literally didn't have any food in the house.

In that recording, either, both, father, brothers and Thursday are pronounced [ˈɪjvə], [ˈbɐʊ̈f], [ˈfɑ̹ːvə], [ˈbrɐvəz] and [ˈfɜːzdi]. Pronouns (they, them, their) and the are not affected.

== Increase in use ==
Th-fronting in the speech of working-class adolescents in Glasgow was reported in 1998, provoking public as well as academic interest. The finding of th-fronting in Glaswegian creates a difficulty for models of language change which hinge on dialect contact associated with geographical mobility since the Glaswegian speakers who used [f] most in the 1997 sample are also those with the lowest geographical mobility. In addition, th-fronting was reported as "a relatively new phenomenon" in Edinburgh in March 2013.

== Homophonous pairs ==
Homophonous pairs
/f, v/	/θ, ð/	IPA	Notes
barf	bath	ˈbɑːf	Non-rhotic accents with trap–bath split.
deaf	death	ˈdɛf	
duff	doth	ˈdʌf	
elf	health	ˈɛlf	With H-dropping.
even	heathen	ˈiːvən	With H-dropping.
ever	heather	ˈɛvə(ɹ)	With H-dropping.
fain	thane	ˈfeɪn	
fain	thegn	ˈfeɪn	
fane	thane	ˈfeɪn	
fane	thegn	ˈfeɪn	
faun	thorn	ˈfɔːn	Non-rhotic accents.
fava	farther	ˈfɑːvə	Non-rhotic accents.
fava	father	ˈfɑːvə	Non-rhotic accents.
fawn	thorn	ˈfɔːn	Non-rhotic accents.
feign	thane	ˈfeɪn	
feign	thegn	ˈfeɪn	
fie	thigh	ˈfaɪ	
fief	thief	ˈfiːf	
fin	thin	ˈfɪn	
fink	think	ˈfɪŋk	
finn	thin	ˈfɪn	
firm	therm	ˈfɜː(ɹ)m	
first	thirst	ˈfɜː(ɹ)st	
for	thaw	ˈfɔː(ɹ)	Non-rhotic accents.
for	Thor	ˈfɔː(ɹ)	
ford	thawed	ˈfɔːd	Non-rhotic accents with horse–hoarse merger.
fore	thaw	ˈfɔː	Non-rhotic accents with horse–hoarse merger.
fore	Thor	ˈfɔː(ɹ)	With horse–hoarse merger.
fort	thought	ˈfɔːt	Non-rhotic accents with horse–hoarse merger.
fought	thought	ˈfɔːt	
four	thaw	ˈfɔː(ɹ)	Non-rhotic accents with horse–hoarse merger.
four	Thor	ˈfɔː(ɹ)	With horse–hoarse merger.
fred	thread	ˈfɹɛd	
free	three	ˈfɹiː	
frees	threes	ˈfɹiːz	
freeze	threes	ˈfɹiːz	
fresh	thresh	ˈfɹɛʃ	
fret	threat	ˈfɹɛt	
frieze	threes	ˈfɹiːz	
frill	thrill	ˈfɹɪl	
fro	throe	ˈfɹəʊ	
fro	throw	ˈfɹəʊ	
froze	throes	ˈfɹəʊz	
froze	throws	ˈfɹəʊz	
funder	thunder	ˈfʌndə(ɹ)	
furred	third	ˈfɜː(ɹ)d	
fervour; fervor	further	ˈfɜː(ɹ)və(ɹ)	
half	hearth	ˈhɑːf	Non-rhotic accents with trap–bath split.
lave	lathe	ˈleɪv	
live	lithe	ˈlaɪv	
loaf	loath	ˈləʊf	
loaves	loathes	ˈləʊvz	
miff	myth	ˈmɪf	
murph	mirth	ˈmɜː(ɹ)f	
never	nether	ˈnɛvə(ɹ)	
oaf	oath	ˈəʊf	
phi	thigh	ˈfaɪ	
reave	wreathe	ˈɹiːv	
reaves	wreathes	ˈɹiːvz	
reaves	wreaths	ˈɹiːvz	
reef	wreath	ˈɹiːf	
reeve	wreathe	ˈɹiːv	
reeves	wreathes	ˈɹiːvz	
reeves	wreaths	ˈɹiːvz	
rive	writhe	ˈɹaɪv	
roof	ruth	ˈɹuːf	Some accents pronounce roof as /ˈɹʊf/.
sheave	sheathe	ˈʃiːv	Some accents pronounce sheave as /ˈʃɪv/.
sheaves	sheathes	ˈʃiːvz	Some accents pronounce sheaves as /ˈʃɪvz/.
sheaves	sheaths	ˈʃiːvz	Some accents pronounce sheaves as /ˈʃɪvz/.
sliver	slither	ˈslɪvə(ɹ)	

== See also ==
- List of th-fronting homophones
- Th-stopping
