= Murphys =

Murphys or Murphy's may refer to:

- Murphys, California, United States, an unincorporated village
  - Murphys Grammar School, on the National Register of Historic Places
  - Murphys Hotel, one of the oldest hotels still operating in California, on the National Register of Historic Places
- Murphys, former name of Meeks Bay, California, an unincorporated community

== See also ==
- Murphy (disambiguation)
- Dropkick Murphys
- Murphy's (disambiguation)
