= Murphy's =

Murphy's may refer to:

- Murphy's Brewery, Ireland
  - Murphy's Irish Stout
- Murphy's Hotel, Richmond, Virginia, United States, demolished in 2007

== See also ==
- Murphy's law, popular adage
- Murphy's crow, a butterfly species
- Murphy's petrel, a seabird species
- Murphys (disambiguation)
