= Murphy, Virginia =

Unincorporated community in Virginia, United States

Coordinates: 37.1264979°N 82.1743035°W

Murphy is an unincorporated community in Buchanan County, Virginia, United States.

== History ==
A post office called Murphy was established in 1901, and remained in operation until it was discontinued in 1963. Robert Murphy served as postmaster.
