= Murphy Radio =

Radio and television manufacturing company

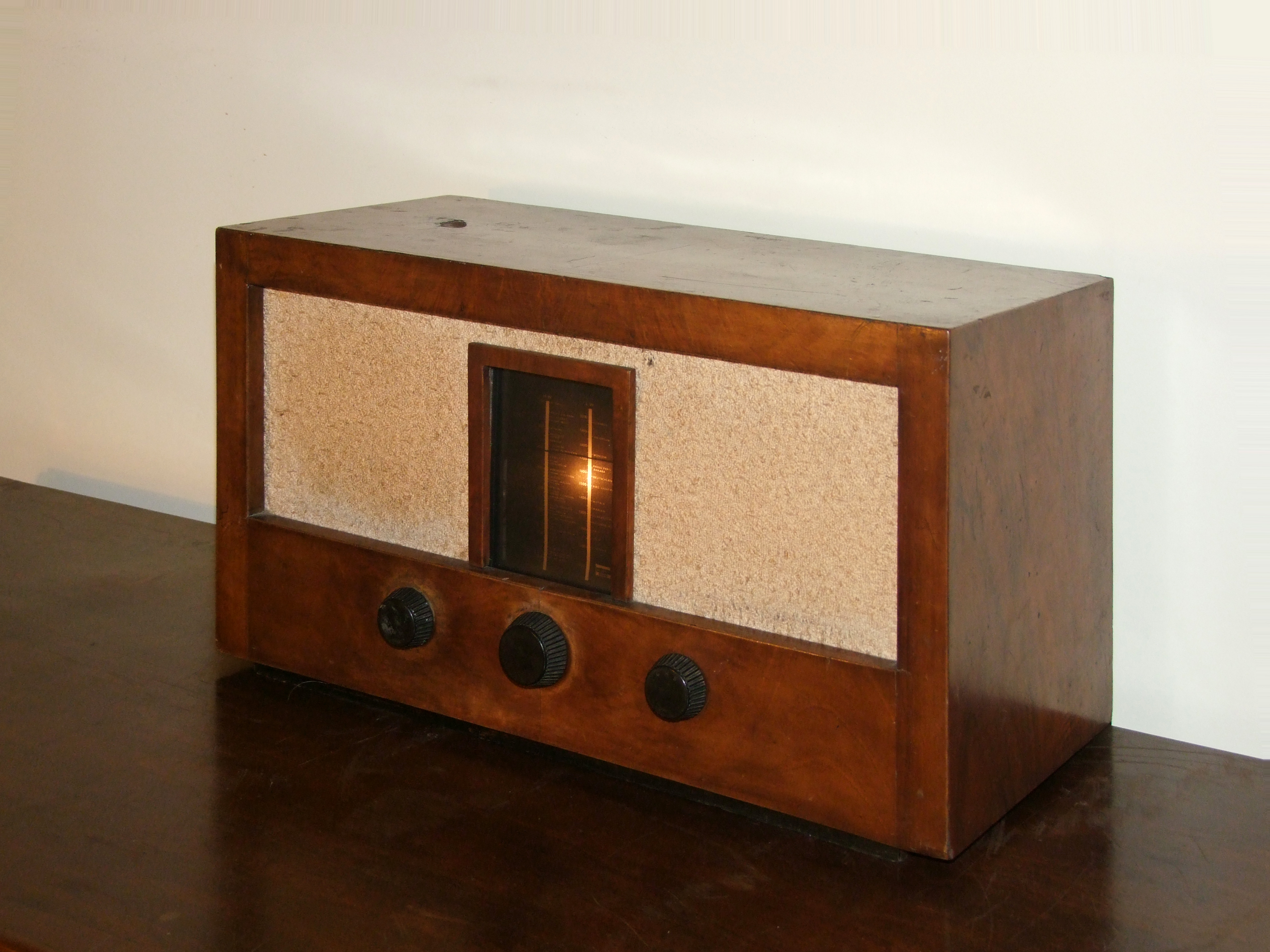
Tabletop wireless model U102, c.1947

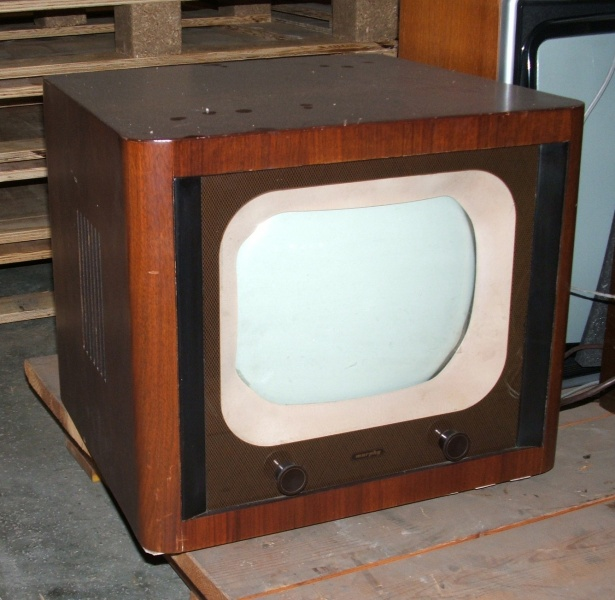
A 1951 Murphy television set held by the Science Museum, London

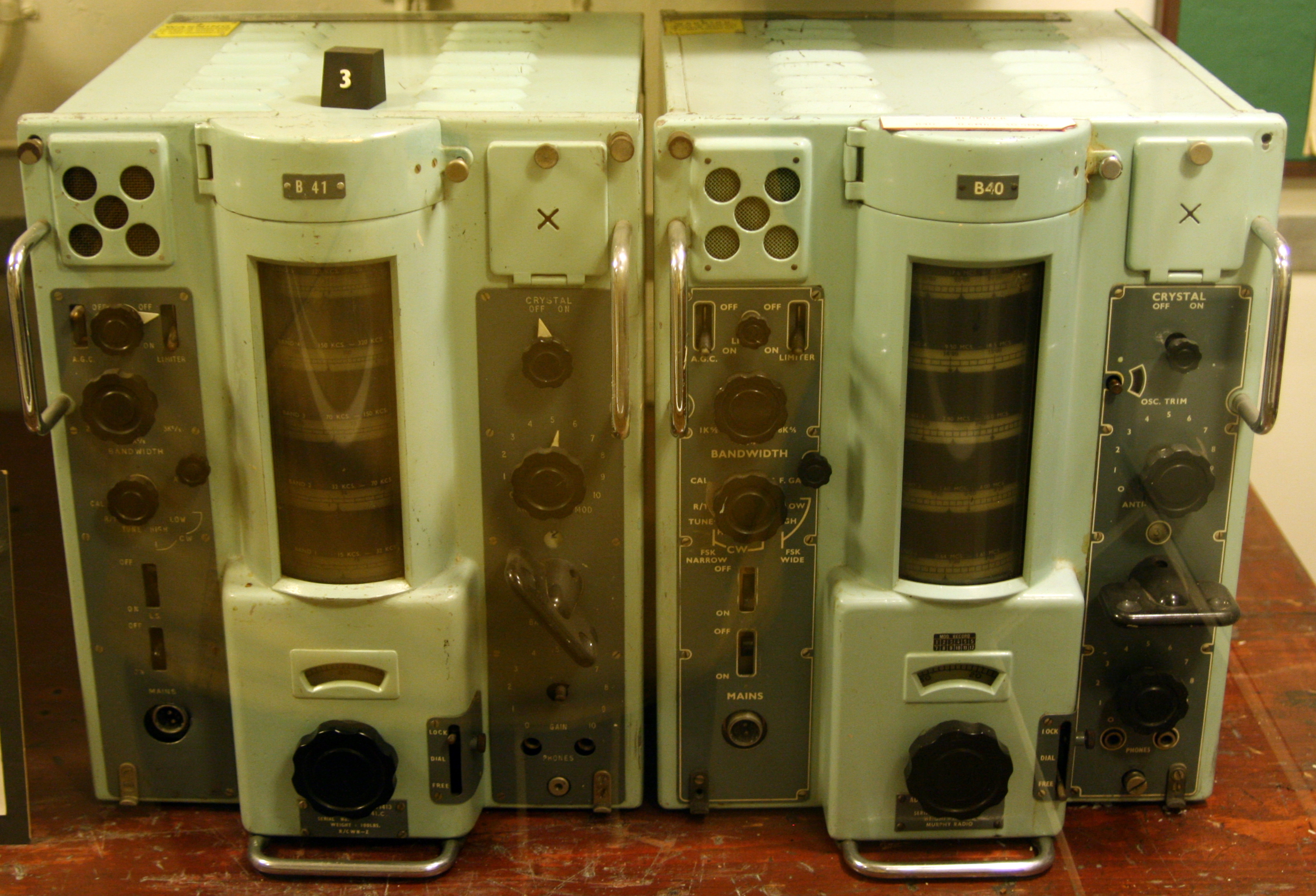
Murphy B41 and B40 naval radios, 1950s

Murphy Radio was a British manufacturer of radios and televisions based in Welwyn Garden City, England.

== History ==
=== 1929: inception ===
Murphy Radio was founded in 1929 by Frank Murphy and E.J. Power as a volume manufacturer of home radio sets. Its factories were in the Hertfordshire town of Welwyn Garden City, England, starting with fewer than 100 employees. Murphy also had a manufacturing facility in Islandbridge, Dublin, Ireland.

=== 1939+: expansion ===
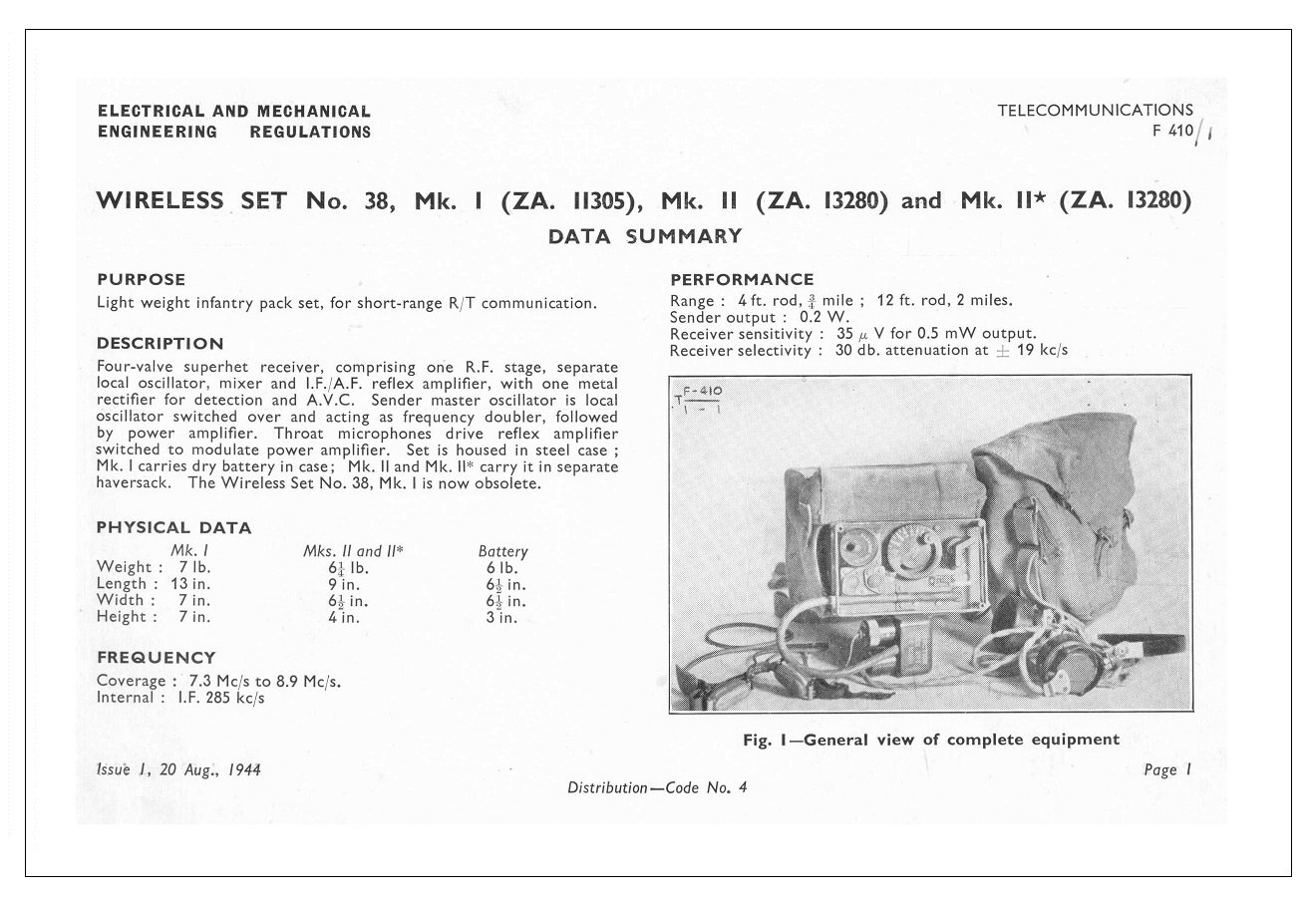
Datasheet for Wireless Set No. 38 (1944)

The company played an important role during World War II, designing and manufacturing radio sets for British Armed Forces use, chiefly the Wireless Set No. 38. After the war, Murphy used its military experience to design and build sets for Naval use, principally the 'B40' series for the British Commonwealth Navies. The company also produced the Larkspur era A41 VHF manpack transceiver for the British Army during the 1950s.

Murphy himself left the company during 1937 and went on to found another company called, perhaps unwisely, 'FM Radio'. He died aged 65, in 1955.

=== 1959 onward ===
The company became well known for the manufacture of television sets and was successful up until 1959 when it encountered trading difficulties, similar to others in the industry. In 1962, The Rank Organisation thought there might be advantages if they merged Murphy with their Bush Radio business. As part of the acquisition and reorganisation by Rank, Murphy acquired the undertaking and assets of Bush as well as Rank Cintel, Rank's electronic division.

== Current status ==
The brand 'Murphy' has survived, but as a licensee for Far Eastern electronics.

== In popular media ==
In 2012, the brand gained attention in India due to the movie Barfi!. A vintage Murphy radio also appears in the opening of the 2012 film Life of Pi.
