= Murdo =

Murdo may refer to:

- Murdo, South Dakota, a city in the United States
- List of Murdos (mountains), summits in Scotland that are over 3,000 feet
- An Anglicised form of the given name Murchadh, including a list of people named Murdo
