= Murph =

Murph may refer to:

== People ==
- Jessie Murph, American singer
- Simona Hunyadi Murph, Romanian-American scientist, engineer and inventor
- Murph Harrold, poker player inducted into the Poker Hall of Fame in 1984

=== Nickname ===
- Emmett Jefferson Murphy III (born 1964), American musician with stage name of Murph (drummer)
- Erwin Chamberlain (1915–1986), Canadian National Hockey League player
- Marvin Leonard Goldberger (1922–2014), American theoretical physicist and former president of Caltech
- Matthew Murphy (born 1984), English rock singer and musician with The Wombats
- Michael P. Murphy (1976-2005), United States Navy SEAL officer posthumously awarded the Medal of Honor
- Mike Murphy (sports radio personality) (born 1951), American talk show host

== Fictional characters ==
- Dale Murphy, in the nonfiction book The Perfect Storm and the 2000 film adaptation
- Murphy Cooper, in the 2014 science fiction film Interstellar
- Murph, keyboardist of the band reformed in the 1980 film The Blues Brothers
- Murphy Savage, in the 1958 war film Imitation General
- Murph, a main character in the novel The Yellow Birds

== Other uses ==
- Murph, a CrossFit workout, named in honor of Michael P. Murphy

== See also ==
- Morph (disambiguation)
- Murphy (disambiguation)
- Jack Roland Murphy (born 1938), American jewel thief, surfing champion, musician, author, artist and convicted murderer known as "Murph the Surf"
