= Murphys Grammar School =

- U.S. National Register of Historic Places
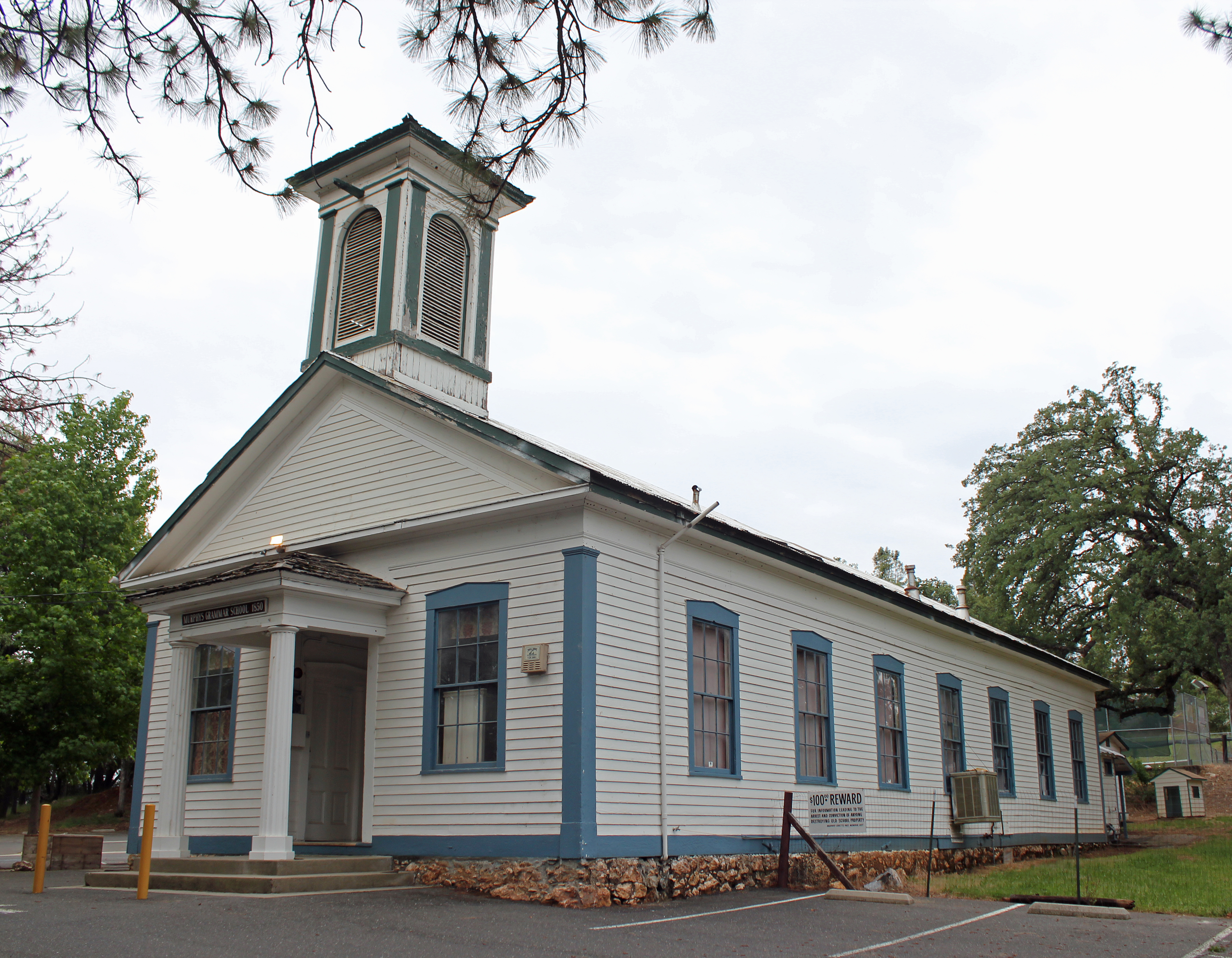
- The school in 2014.

- Location within California Location within the United States
- Location: Jones St., Murphys, California
- Coordinates: 38°08′09″N 120°27′28″W
- Area: 1.8 acres (0.73 ha)
- Built: 1860
- Architectural style: Greek Revival
- NRHP reference No.: 73000398
- Added to NRHP: June 8, 1973

Murphys Grammar School is a historic school building in Murphys, California. Built in 1860, the school was the first public school in Murphys. The school was designed in a vernacular Greek Revival style, which was popular at the time of its construction; its design includes a cornice held up by square pilasters, a pedimented gable, and a cupola over the entrance with its own cornice and square pilasters. The school operated continuously from its opening until it closed in 1973; at the time of its closing, it was the longest continuously running school west of the Mississippi River.

Albert Abraham Michelson, the first American to win the Nobel Prize in Physics, attended the school.

Murphys Grammar School was added to the National Register of Historic Places on June 8, 1973.
