= Camp Murphy =

Camp Murphy may refer to:

- Camp Murphy (Florida), a former army camp in Florida
- The Melbourne Cricket Ground, occupied by the US military during World War II
- Murphys, California, a census-designated place
- The former name of Camp Aguinaldo, the headquarters of the Armed Forces of the Philippines
