= Wireless Set No. 38 =

British Army man-portable short-range radio

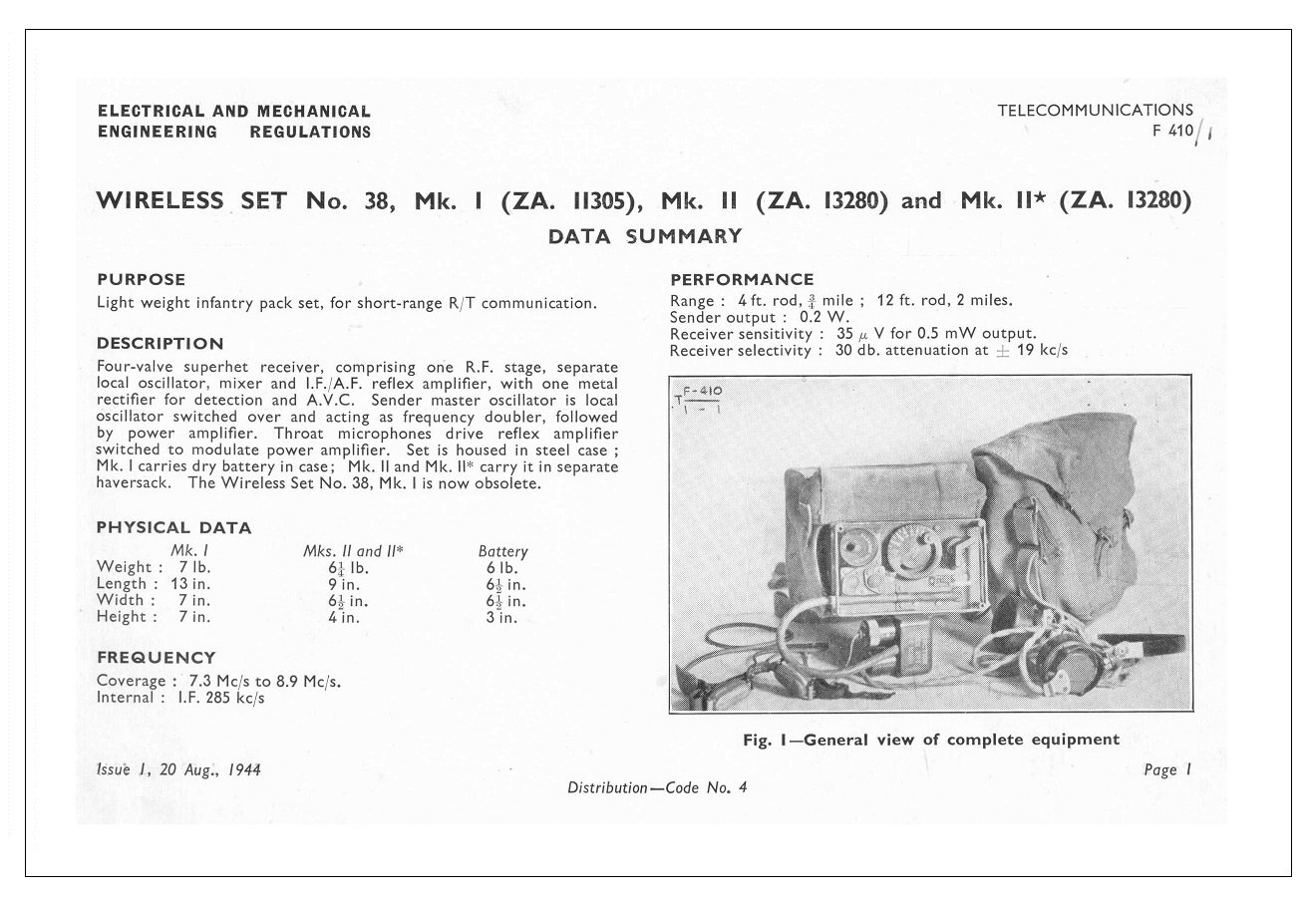
Wireless Set No. 38 (1944)

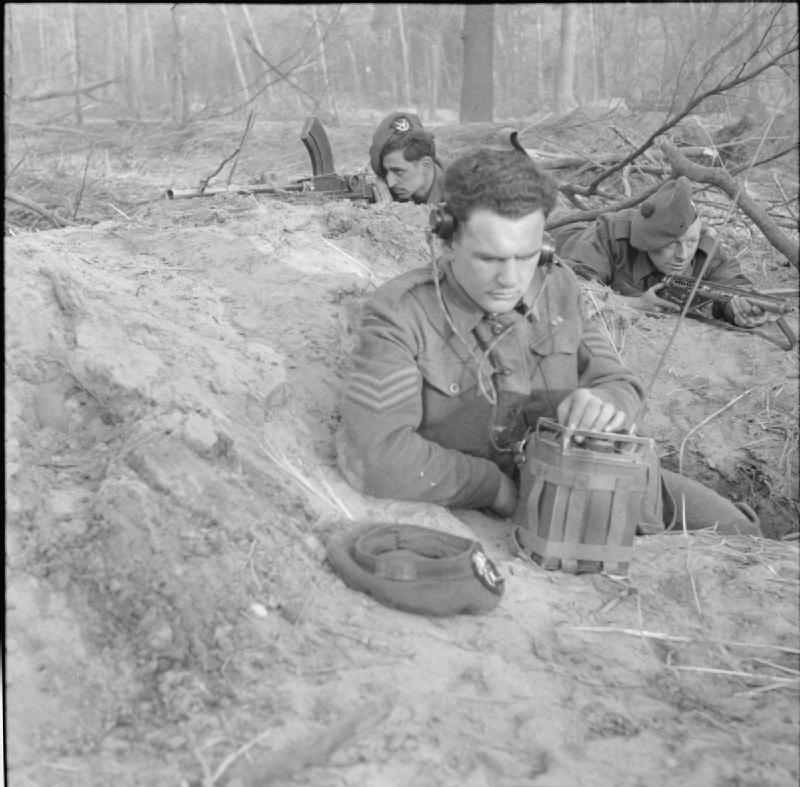
British infantry soldier operating a Wireless Set No. 38

The Wireless Set No. 38 was a High frequency (HF) portable man-pack radio transceiver used by the British Army during World War II. Designed by Murphy Radio, it was a five-valve set covering 7.4 to 9 MHz and powered by a large dry cell battery carried in a separate haversack. An armoured fighting vehicle variant was also developed for use alongside the Wireless Set No. 19 in armoured vehicles to allow direct communication between tank commanders and infantry. In 1945, a Mk. III version was produced housed in a sealed diecast metal enclosure.

== See also ==
- List of radios
