= Murphy (bald eagle) =

Bald eagle (c. 1992–2025)

- Undated picture of Murphy
- Species: Bald eagle
- Sex: Male
- Hatched: c. 1992
- Died: March 15, 2025 (aged 33); Valley Park, Missouri, U.S.
- Known for: Incubating a rock while in captivity

Murphy (c. 1992 – March 15, 2025) was a bald eagle at the World Bird Sanctuary in Missouri, United States, who gained popularity in 2023 for his incubation of a rock. Murphy hatched in 1992 and first arrived at the sanctuary the next year with a broken leg. After his initial release, he returned with a broken wing, which permanently impaired him from flying and made him unable to survive in the wild. He spent the rest of his life at the sanctuary.

Following several incidents where he attacked other eagles for approaching a rock he was incubating, Murphy was moved to a private enclosure. A sign explaining Murphy's situation was displayed and went viral online. Due to popular demand from visitors, Murphy was given a rescued eaglet to take care of. Murphy grew a positive relationship with the chick. The eaglet was eventually released and replaced with another rescued chick, which he continued to care for until his death.

Murphy died of an injury sustained in the tornado outbreak of March 13–16, 2025.

== Early life ==
Murphy hatched around 1992; he first arrived at the World Bird Sanctuary the following year. Murphy was transported from Oklahoma with a broken leg; following his treatment and release, he returned to the sanctuary with a broken wing. The injury permanently rendered him unable to fly or survive in the wild; as a result, he remained at the sanctuary for the rest of his life.

== Online popularity ==
Sanctuary staff noticed in March 2023 that Murphy began incubating a rock in the bald eagle exhibit; over time, he became more aggressive and would scream or charge at other eagles approaching him. During the breeding season, birds tend to incubate objects like rocks or golf balls when there are no eggs available. Following these incidents, Murphy was moved to a private enclosure on April 4, 2023; a sign informing visitors of the matter was posted. He had no prior history of incubating. After an image of the sign went viral, visitors began asking the sanctuary to give Murphy an eaglet. Frequent updates on Murphy online further contributed to his popularity.

A few days prior to Murphy's transfer, sanctuary staff recovered a 14-day-old eaglet that had fallen from a nest due to high winds; it was dubbed "23-126". Following the chick's examination and recovery, the World Bird Sanctuary decided to give it to one of their eagles. They chose Murphy due to his protective nature with his rock. Initially, the rescue team put the eaglet in a cage, which was then put inside Murphy's nest. The interactions between Murphy and the eaglet were heavily monitored. After nearly a week of staying in the nest, the eaglet was freed; by then, Murphy had a growing interest in the chick. The same day, Murphy and the eaglet were given fish to eat. When staff returned, the chick had already been fed by Murphy. 23-126 was eventually released to the wild, and a new eaglet, dubbed "24-159", took its place. The latter was released on January 31, 2026 at Audubon Center at Riverlands in West Alton, Missouri.

== Death ==
Murphy's body was found on March 15, 2025; he died during the tornado outbreak of March 13–16, 2025. A necropsy found out he had sustained head trauma; the circumstances of his death are unclear. Although the birds at the sanctuary were given access to shelters, they were not evacuated as there were no tornadoes in the area. None of the other birds in the aviary had been injured during the storm.
