= British shadow factories =

Military factories built during the buildup to World War 2 in Britain

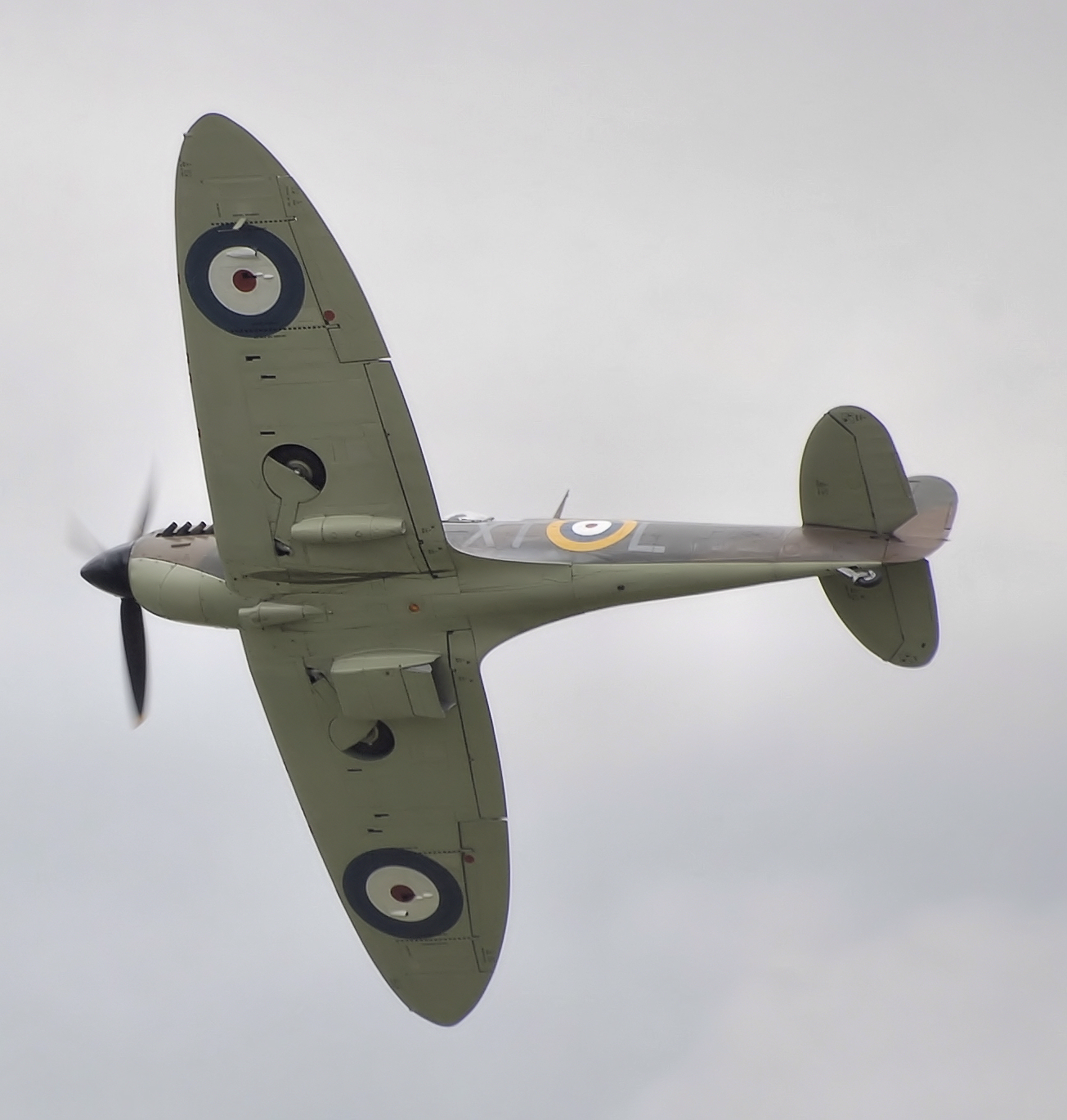
Spitfire Mark IIa believed to be the 14th aircraft built at Castle Bromwich

British shadow factories were the outcome of the Shadow Scheme, a plan devised in 1935 and developed by the British government in the buildup to World War II to try to meet the urgent need for more aircraft using technology transfer from the motor industry to implement additional manufacturing capacity.

The term 'shadow' was not intended to mean secrecy, but rather the protected environment they would receive by being staffed by all levels of skilled motor industry people alongside (in the shadow of) their own similar civilian motor industry operations.

A directorate of Aeronautical Production was formed in March 1936 with responsibility for the manufacture of airframes as well as engines, associated equipment and armaments. The project was headed by Herbert Austin and developed by the Air Ministry under the internal project name of the Shadow Scheme. Sir Kingsley Wood took responsibility for the scheme in May 1938, on his appointment as Secretary of State for Air in place of Lord Swinton.

Many more factories were built as part of the dispersal scheme designed to reduce the risk of a total collapse of production if what would otherwise be a major facility were bombed, though these were not shadow factories.

== Purpose and use ==
It was impossible for these facilities to be secret, though they were camouflaged after hostilities began. They were war materiel production facilities built in "the shadow" of motor industry plants to facilitate technology transfer to aircraft construction and run, for a substantial management fee, in parallel under direct control of the motor industry business along with distributed facilities. General Erhard Milch, chief administrator of the Luftwaffe, was in Britain in the autumn of 1937 inspecting new shadow factories in Birmingham and Coventry, RAF aeroplanes and airfields.

=== Background ===
Up until the middle of 1938, the Air Ministry had been headed by Lord Swinton. He had been forced by Prime Minister Neville Chamberlain to resign his position due to a lack of progress in re-arming the Royal Air Force, the result of obstruction by William Morris, Lord Nuffield. Swinton's civil servants approached their new boss, Sir Kingsley Wood, and showed him a series of informal questions that they had asked since 1935 on the subject, such as those posed to Morris Motors with regard to aircraft engine production capability at its Cowley plant in Oxford. As it turned out, the specialised high-output engines required by the RAF were made by Armstrong Siddeley, Bristol Aeroplane, Napier & Son and Rolls-Royce, all of which employed a high number of sub-contractors. Despite their new factories, protestations by Wolseley Aero Engines (Nuffield) and Alvis were ignored. Their products were not required. Engines were specified primarily by the designers of aircraft though the Air Ministry did sometimes specify the engine to be used. Nuffield did participate after Wood's appointment, providing the Castle Bromwich Factory and promising a thousand Spitfires by June 1940 but, after two years, management was so poor that when June 1940 arrived not one Spitfire had been produced there. Castle Bromwich was withdrawn from Nuffield by Lord Beaverbrook. the Minister of Aircraft Production, and placed under the wing of Vickers-Supermarine.

=== Implementation ===
The plan had two parts:

- Development of nine new factories. The government would build and equip the factories. Motor car companies would be asked to gain experience in the making of engine parts so, if war broke out, the new factories could immediately go into full production.
- Extensions to existing factory complexes to allow either easier switching to aircraft industry capability, or production capacity expansion.

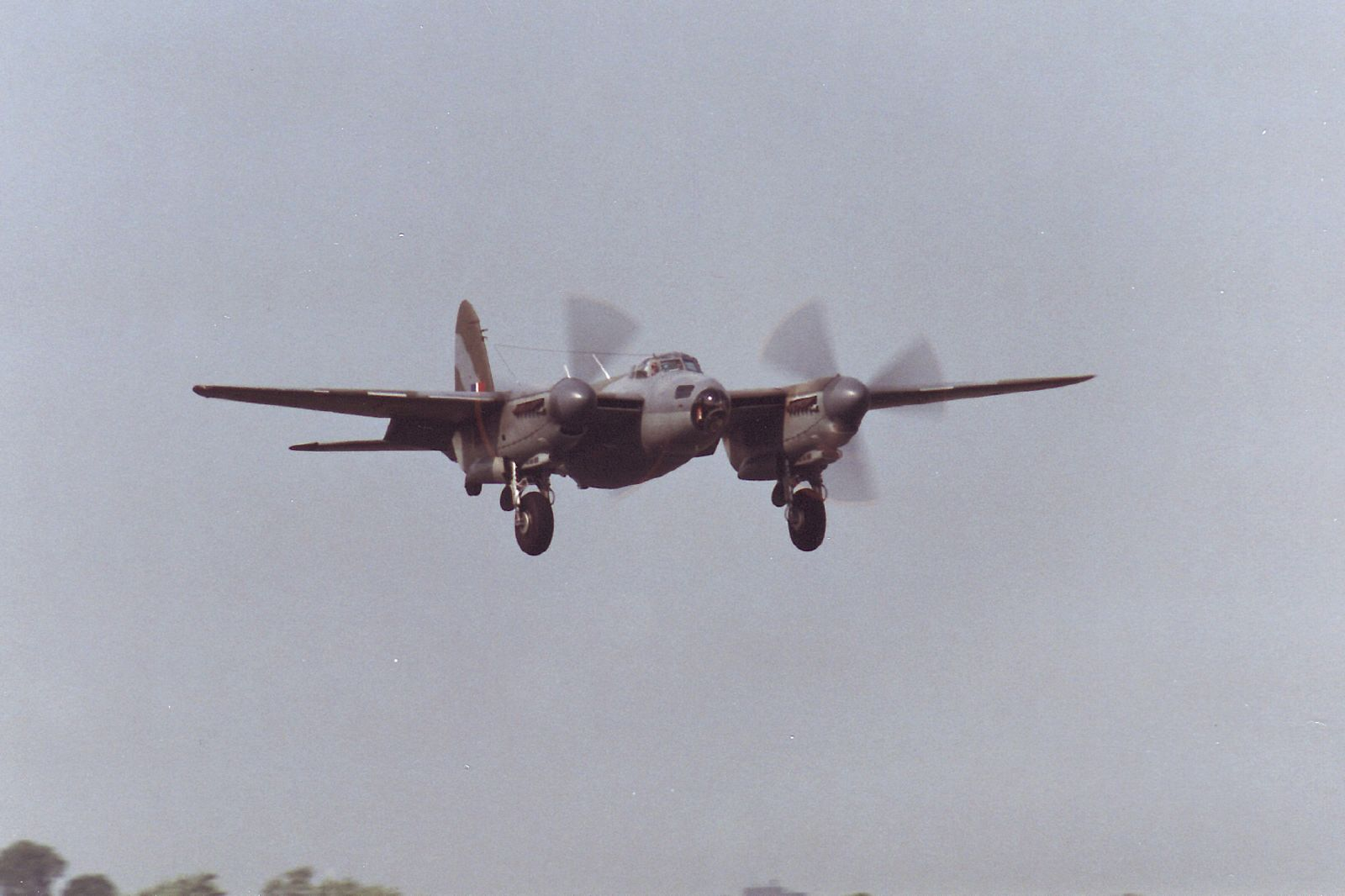
In the UK, the major production for the de Havilland Mosquito bombers was Standard Motor Co, Canley (Coventry) and de Havilland's own sites in Hertfordshire.

Under the plan, there was government funding for the building of these new production facilities, in the form of grants and loans. Key to the plan were the products and plans of Rolls-Royce, whose Merlin engine powered many of the key aircraft being developed by the Air Ministry, as well as Bristol Hercules radial engine. Bristol Aeroplane would not allow shadow factories to build complete engines, only components. The exception was Austin.

The first motor manufacturers chosen for engine shadows were: Austin, Daimler, Humber (Rootes Securities), Singer, Standard, Rover and Wolseley. In the event Lord Nuffield took Wolseley out of the arrangement and Singer proved to be in serious financial difficulty.

==== The buildings ====
Wood handed the overall project implementation to the Directorate of Air Ministry Factories, appointing Herbert Austin to lead the initiative (most of the facilities to be developed were alongside existing motor vehicle factories), and the technical liaison with the aircraft industry to Charles Bruce-Gardner. He also handed the delivery of the key new factory in Castle Bromwich, that was contracted to deliver 1,000 new Supermarine Spitfires to the RAF by the end of 1940, to Lord Nuffield, though in May 1940 the responsibility had to be taken from Nuffield and given to Vickers.

The buildings were sheds up to 2,000 feet (610 m) long lit either by glazed roofs or "north-lit". Office accommodation was brick, and wherever possible faced a main road. These buildings were extremely adaptable and would remain part of the British industrial landscape for more than 50 years. One of the largest was Austin's Cofton Hackett, beside their Longbridge plant, started in August 1936. 1,530 feet (470 m) long and 410 feet (120 m) wide, the structure covered 20 acres (81,000 m^{2}). Later a 15 acres (61,000 m^{2}) airframe factory was added, then a flight shed 500 feet (150 m) by 190 feet (58 m) was attached to the airframe factory.

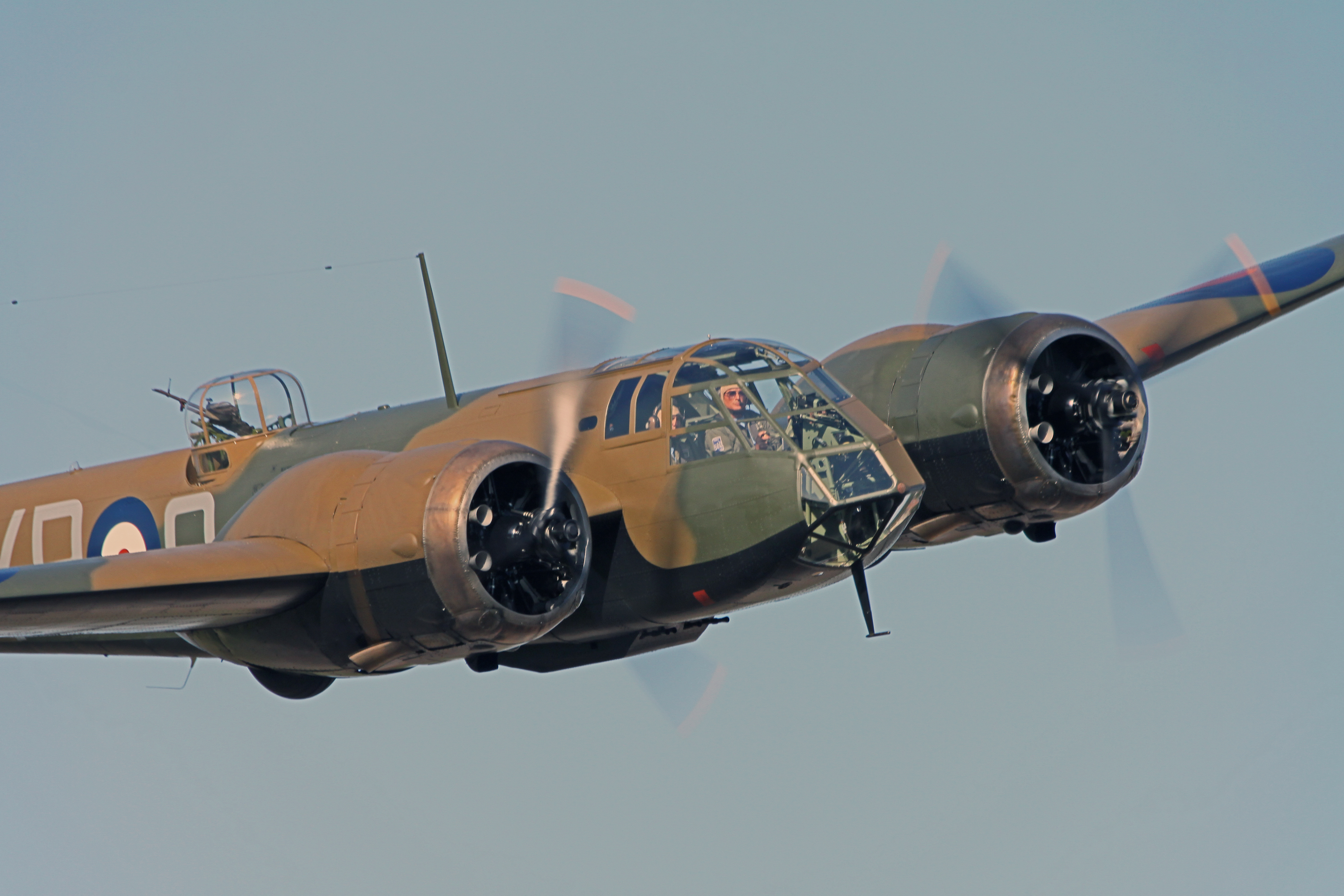
Bristol Blenheim light bombers were built at Rootes Blythe Bridge and Speke.

The new factory buildings were models of efficient factory layout. They had wide, clear gangways and good lighting, and they were free of shafting and belt drives. The five shadow factories in Coventry were all in production by the end of October 1937 and they were all making parts of the Bristol Mercury engine. By January 1938 two of those shadow factories were producing complete airframes. In July 1938 the first bomber completely built in a shadow factory (Austin's) was flown in front of Sir Kingsley Wood, Secretary of State for Air. It was said eight shadow factories constructing aircraft components were in production in or near Coventry in February 1940.

As the scheme progressed, and after the death of Austin in 1941, the Directorate of Air Ministry Factories, under the auspices of the Ministry of Aircraft Production (MAP), gradually took charge of the construction of the buildings required for aircraft production. In early 1943 the functions of the directorate of Air Ministry Factories were transferred to the Ministry of Works.

Scotland

There were three waves of construction of shadow factories and only the third and smallest reached Scotland in the shape of the factory at Hillington producing Rolls-Royce's Merlin engines. Ferranti's factory in Crewe Toll, Edinburgh will have been secret.

Empire

Similar plans were introduced in Canada, Australia, New Zealand and South Africa.

== List of shadow factories ==
Location	Manager for Ministry of Aircraft Production	Original use	Wartime production	Today
Acocks Green, south of Birmingham	Rover Aero	Westwood family's market garden	Parts for Bristol Hercules radial engine	Redeveloped as housing
Bankfield Shed, Barnoldswick	Rover Aero	Weaving shed	Jet engine development	Handed over to Rolls-Royce in 1943
Banner Lane, Coventry	Standard; Aero No. 2	Golf course	Bristol Hercules radial engines	Ferguson then Massey Ferguson tractors. Closed 2002. Now housing
Garden Street Mill, Blackburn	J. E. Baxter and Co	Cotton mill	Gas masks	Newman's Footwear, now demolished.
Blythe Bridge, Staffordshire	Rootes Securities		Blenheim, Beaufort, Beaufighter	
Lostock, Bolton, Lancashire	de Havilland		Airscrews	
Browns Lane, Coventry	Daimler	Farmland	Aero engines, Aircraft sub-assemblies	Jaguar's Browns Lane plant, demolished 2008, now housing and an industrial estate
Burtonwood, Warrington	Fairey Aviation		Assembled and modified imported American aircraft	
Canley-Fletchamstead Hy, Coventry	Standard; Aero No. 1	Vacant land on Standard's Canley site	Bristol Beaufighter de Havilland Mosquito	Standard Motor Company demolished after closure in 1980. Now housing
Canley-Fletchamstead Hy, Coventry	H M Hobson	Vacant land on Standard's Canley site	Carburettors for aircraft engines	Standard Motor Company demolished after closure in 1980. Now housing
Castle Bromwich, West Midlands	Nuffield Organization then Vickers	Farm/Sewage works	11,989 Supermarine Spitfires, Avro Lancaster	Dunlop Research Centre, Fisher & Ludlow — Pressed Steel, Jaguar
Caversham (Star Road), Berkshire	Unknown	Purpose-built factory	Spitfire fuselages and engines	Housing
Christchurch, Hampshire	Airspeed		Airspeed Oxford	Mixed retail units
Clayton-le-Moors, Accrington	Bristol Aeroplane Company		Aircraft engines	Sold to English Electric, now the GEC industrial estate
Waterloo Mill, Clitheroe	Rover Company, then Rolls-Royce	Cotton Mill	Jet Engine R & D	Sold to Lucas Aerospace, now housing
Clifton near Manchester	Magnesium Elektron		Magnesium alloys	
Cofton Hackett, East Works, Longbridge	Austin	Farmland in Groveley Lane	Aero engines, Bristol Mercury and Bristol Pegasus radial engines Aircraft production – Fairey Battle, Stirling, Avro Lancaster, Vickers Wellingtons	Redeveloped as housing
Coventry, Stoke Aldermoor Lane	Humber		Aero engines	
Crewe, Cheshire	Rolls-Royce	Farmland	Rolls-Royce Merlin	Bentley Crewe
Cwmbran, South Wales	Lucas	Farmland	Aircraft turrets	
Distington, Cumberland	High Duty Alloys Ltd	Farmland	Aircraft parts made of Hiduminium	Abandoned
Wheatley Hall Road, Doncaster	Crompton Parkinson	Greenfield site	.303 rifle ammunition	International Harvester tractors, site now redeveloped.
Drakelow Tunnels, Kidderminster	Rover Company	Hills	Parts for Bristol Mercury and Pegasus, and Rolls-Royce Meteor engines for tank use	Preserved as former Cold War site
Hillington, Glasgow	Rolls-Royce	Farmland	Rolls-Royce Merlin	Closed 2005, redeveloped as an industrial estate.
Valley Works, Langley Mill, Derbyshire	Collaro		Various munitions items	Vic Hallam prefabricated buildings
Leavesden, Hertfordshire	de Havilland	Greenfield site	de Havilland Mosquito	Used by Rolls-Royce to manufacture helicopter engines, now used as a film studio
Melton Road Works, Leicester	British Thomson-Houston		Aircraft magnetos and starter-motors	Used as a lamp factory by AEI which later sold its lighting interests to Thorn
Leyland, Lancashire, BX Factory	Leyland Motors	Greenfield site	Armoured Vehicle production 1940-1945	Commercial vehicle production post war, site now re-developed
Pine End Works, Lydney, Gloucestershire	Factories Direction Ltd.		Plywood for the aircraft industry	Demolished
Meir, Stoke-on-Trent	Rootes Securities	Air Field	Harvard assembly, Mustang modifications	Aerodrome, now housing
Reading, Berkshire	Vincents	Coachworks	Spitfire parts	Thames Tower office block
Reading, Berkshire	Great Western Motors	Garage	Spitfire parts	Retail park
Ryton, south east of Coventry	Humber	Farmland	Aircraft engines	Car production, now redeveloped
Salisbury, Wiltshire	Supermarine		Spitfire assembly	redeveloped as housing
Samlesbury Aerodrome	English Electric		Handley Page Halifax	BAE Systems aircraft factory
Lode Lane, Solihull	Rover	Farmland	Parts for Bristol Hercules radial engine	Land Rover Solihull manufacturing
Speke Airport, Lancashire	Rootes Securities	Speke Airport	Bristol Blenheim light bomber, Handley Page Halifax heavy bomber aircraft	Dunlop tyres, footwear, golf and tennis balls, now redeveloped as industrial estate
Staverton, Gloucestershire	Rotol	Staverton Airport	Variable pitch airscrews	Rotol Gloucester Airport
Errwood Park, Stockport	Fairey Aviation		Beaufighters then Handley Page Halifax bombers	
Trafford Park, Manchester	Ford	Derelict motor assembly plant	Rolls-Royce Merlin	Modern industrial uses
Mosley Road, Trafford Park, Manchester	Metropolitan-Vickers		Avro Lancaster	Modern industrial uses
Willesden, North London	Freestone and Webb	Coach builders	Wing tips for the Spitfire	Housing
Woodstock Mill, Oldham, Lancashire	H M Hobson	Cotton mill	Carburettors for aircraft engines	Seddon Atkinson truck factory, now used as a distribution centre
Moorcroft Mills, Ossett	Rotol	Hepworth Brothers Limited Textile mill	Variable pitch airscrews	Later sold to Jonas Woodhead and Son, manufacturer of vehicle shock absorbers, site now re-developed for housing

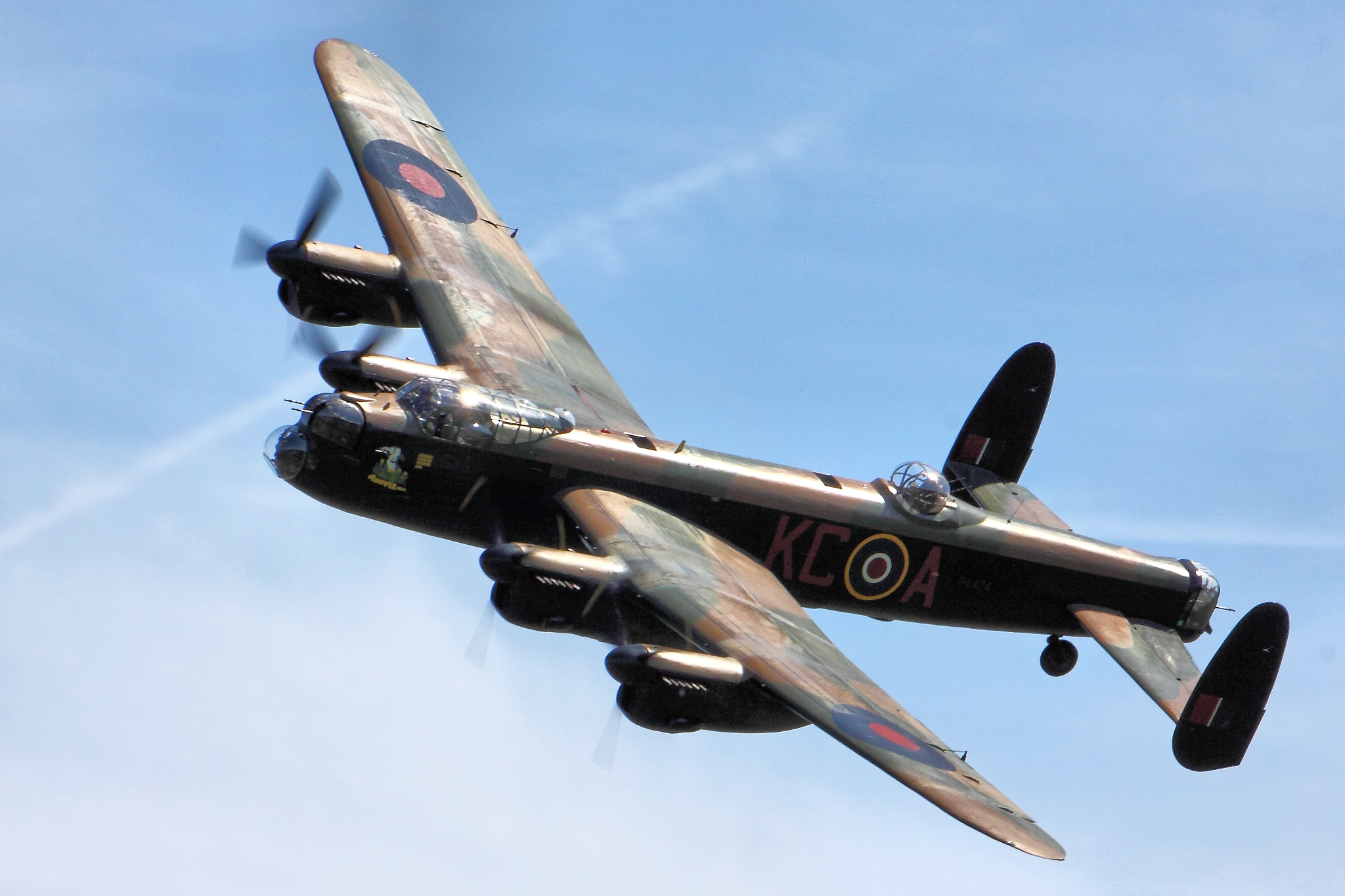
Avro Lancaster Cofton Hackett and Castle Bromwich

== Strategic dispersal ==
The White Paper on Defence published in February 1937 revealed that steps had been taken to reduce the risk of air attack delivering a knockout blow on sources of essential supplies, even at the cost of some duplication, by building new satellite plants which would also draw labour from congested as well as distressed areas. There were still areas of severe unemployment.

=== London Aircraft Production Group ===
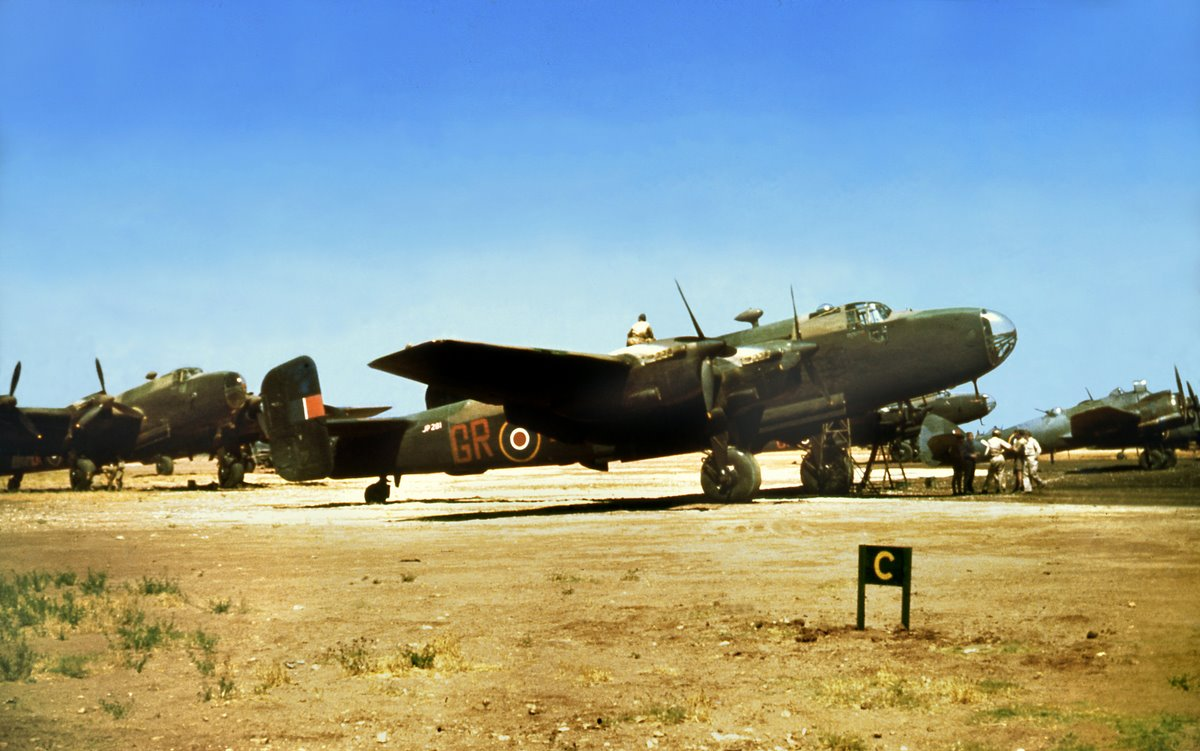
Handley Page Halifax bombers 5 November 1944

In parallel with the Shadow Factory scheme, the London Aircraft Production Group (LAPG) was formed in 1940 by combining management of factories and workshops of Chrysler at Kew, Duple, Express Motor & Bodyworks, Park Royal Coachworks and London Transport.

The major activity of the group was the production of Handley Page Halifax bombers for the Royal Air Force, ammunition, gun parts, armoured vehicles and spare parts for vehicles. The group was led by London Transport from its works at Chiswick and Aldenham and the new De Havilland factory at Leavesden, Hertfordshire, which had a large purpose-built factory and airfield (construction of both was authorised on 10 January 1940) for production, assembly and flight testing of completed Halifax bombers.

The following list of eight members of the London Aircraft Production Group was published in March 1945: This includes LAPG members with factories at Preston, Speke and Stockport.

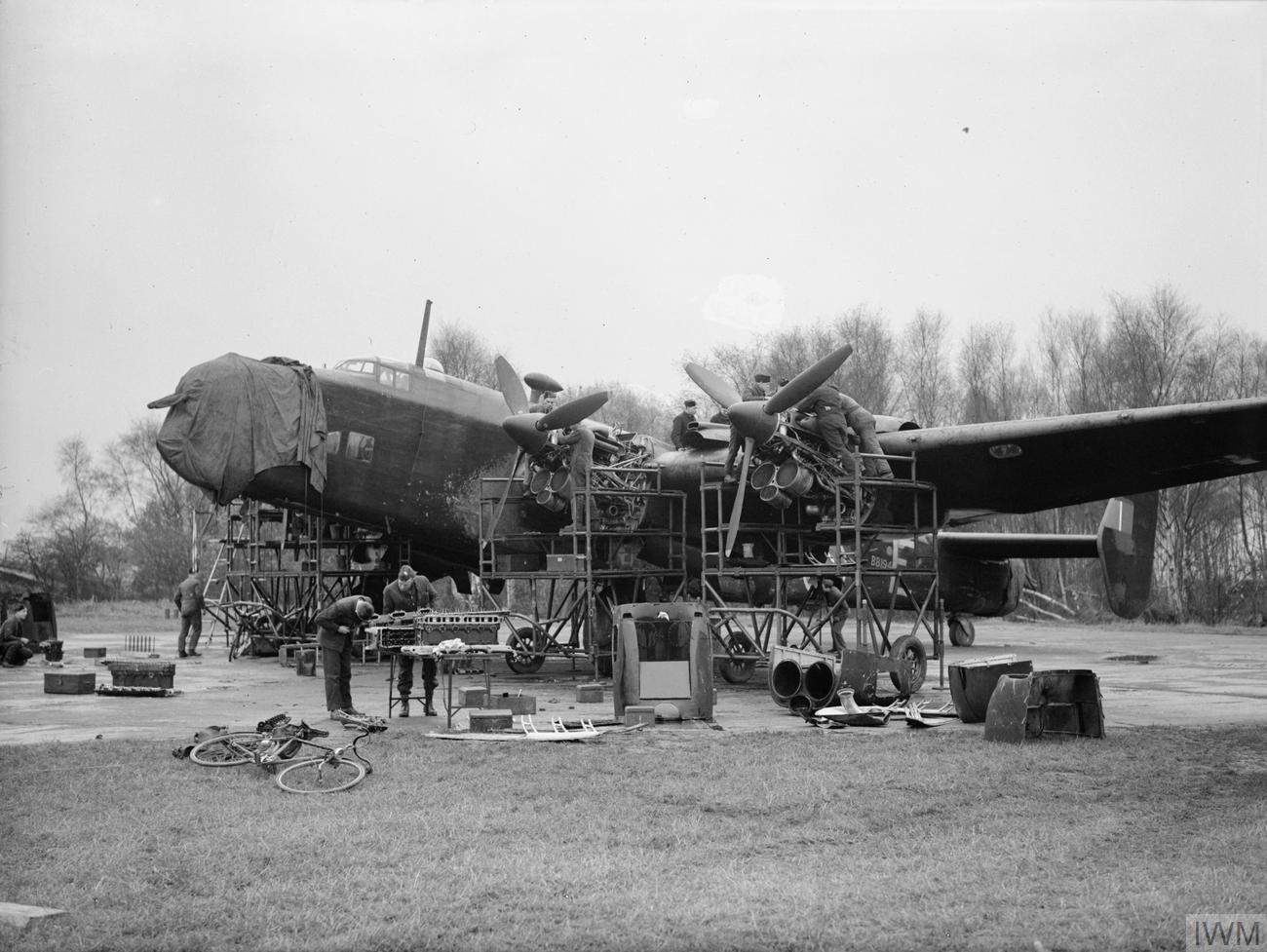
Halifax has its 4 Merlins overhauled in a dispersal in Melbourne, East Riding of Yorkshire.

English Electric in Preston
London Passenger Transport Board — made the centre section and installed fittings and equipment for the front part of the fuselage
Rootes Securities in Speke
Chrysler Motors — rear part of the fuselage
Express Motor and Body Works — intermediate wings and tail-plane
Duple Bodies and Motors — the shell and components for the front part of the fuselage
Park Royal Coachworks — outer wings
Fairey Aviation Company in Stockport

from May 1941 they took responsibility for final erection followed by the test flight and their first aircraft was airborne before the end of 1941. They were allotted their own aerodromes instead of sending aircraft to the Handley Page aerodrome.

At peak the group involved 41 factories and dispersal units, 660 subcontractors and more than 51,000 employees,

Ultimately output rose to 200 Halifaxes a month and the group provided something like 40 per cent of the nation's heavy bomber output. Halifax bombers dropped more than 200,000 tons of bombs.

Sir Frederick Handley Page's "thank you" to these "daughter" firms was a luncheon at The Dorchester at which the head of each firm received a silver model of a Halifax bomber and representative workmen received scrolls of commendation.

Due to the high priority placed on aircraft production, large numbers of workers were drafted with little experience or training in aircraft production, with over half the workforce eventually being female. At its peak the LAPG included 41 factories or sites, 600 sub-contractors and 51,000 employees, producing one aircraft an hour. The first Halifax from the LAPG was delivered in 1941 and the last, named London Pride, in April 1945.

=== Follow-on initiatives ===
The shadow factory proposals and implementation, particularly its rigidity when bombed, meant that other key areas of military production prepared their own dispersal factory plans:

- Alvis had 20 sites in Coventry alone, producing vehicles and munitions. Soon after the total destruction of the Alvis factory by enemy action in 1940 Alvis were operating eight dispersal factories and thus managed to resume deliveries of their most important products. They were allocated nine further dispersal factories following further enemy attacks and after Pearl Harbor at the end of 1941 Alvis organised, equipped and managed a new shadow factory to make variable pitch propeller hubs.
- Rover managed and controlled six shadow factories on behalf of the Government and ran eighteen different dispersal factories of their own.

When the Birmingham Small Arms plant at Small Heath, the sole producer of service rifle barrels and main aircraft machine guns, was bombed by the Luftwaffe in August–November 1940, it caused delays in productions, which reportedly worried PM Churchill the most among all the industrial damage during the Blitz. The Government Ministry of Supply and BSA immediately began a process of production dispersal throughout Britain, through the shadow factory scheme. Later in the war BSA controlled 67 factories from its Small Heath office, employing 28,000 people operating 25,000 machine tools, and produced more than half the small arms supplied to Britain's forces during the war.

- In British India in 1942, a Small Arms Factory in Kanpur was built as a shadow for the Rifle Factory Ishapore.

== List of dispersal factories (incomplete) ==
Location	Owner	Original use	Wartime production	Today
Whitelands Mill, Ashton-under-Lyne	Avro	Cotton Mill	Aircraft parts	Abbey Thermosets
Axminster, Devon	Axminster Carpets	Carpets	Stirrup pumps	Carpets
Blackpool, Lancashire	Vickers	RAF Squires Gate	Bombers	Blackpool International Airport
Belfast, Northern Ireland	Short & Harland		Bombers and Flying Boats	Short Brothers
Birmingham	Fisher and Ludlow			
Brechin	Coventry Gauge & Tool Co			Matrix International
Broughton, Flintshire	Vickers	Farmland	Aircraft production	Airbus Industrie, Broughton
Hargher Clough Mill, Burnley	Joseph Lucas Limited	Cotton weaving shed	Aircraft parts	Demolished
Byley, Cheshire	Vickers		Vickers Wellington	
Wren Mill, Chadderton	Cossor	Cotton Mill	CRTs for Radar	Demolished, replaced by an Asda supermarket
Cheltenham, Gloucestershire	Smiths Instruments		Clocks and watches	
Orchard Mill, Darwen	ICI	Cotton Mill	Perspex mouldings for aircraft canopies and windows	Lucite plastics
Distington, Cumbria	High Duty Alloys Ltd	Farmland	Aircraft parts made of Hiduminium	Abandoned
Crewe Toll, Edinburgh	Ferranti		Electrical optical and mechanical assemblies	Ferranti
Ivy Mill, Failsworth	Avro	Cotton Mill	Aircraft parts	
Grantham, Lincolnshire	BMARC	Farmland	Hispano-Suiza 20 mm cannon	Redeveloped
Grappenhall, near Warrington	Metropolitan-Vickers	Leather tannery	Sintered carbides for cutting tools and armour piercing projectiles	Demolished and replaced by housing.
Hawarden, Flint	Vickers	Farmland	5,540 Vickers Wellingtons and 235 Avro Lancasters	Airbus Industrie, Broughton
Hawthorn, Box and Corsham, Wiltshire	Bristol Aeroplane Company	Quarry, Bath stone	Intended for aircraft engines but little used	Became Central Government War Headquarters, closed 2005
Hawthorn, Corsham, Wiltshire	BSA	Quarry, Bath stone	M1919 Browning machine gun	Abandoned under RAF Rudloe Manor
Hednesford, Staffordshire			Roller bearings	Fafnir Bearing
Ilminster, Somerset	Standard Telephones and Cables	Rope Works	Radio Valves	
East Lancashire Road, Liverpool	Napier & Son		Aircraft engine production, Napier Sabre	English Electric then industrial estate
Linwood, Paisley Scotland	Beardmore's	Farmland	High-grade Steel for guns	Pressed Steel then Rootes Group's North Plant
Cowbridge House, Malmesbury, Wiltshire	EKCO	Country mansion	Radar equipment	Demolished and replaced by housing.
Newcastle-under-Lyme, Staffordshire	BSA	Farmland	Hispano-Suiza 20 mm cannon	Redeveloped
Newtown, Powys, Wales	Accles & Pollock	Farmland	Tubular steel: aircraft frames, gun barrels	Industrial estate
Northampton (Duston)	British Timken	Farmland	Roller bearings	Opened 1941, closed 2002 – moved to Poland. Demolished and replaced by housing.
Farme Cross, Rutherglen	EKCO		Electrical components	Used as a sewing factory, now demolished
Sawbridgeworth, Hertfordshire	Walter Lawrence plc	Existing construction joinery workshops	Mosquito wings	Housing development
Cape Mill and Duke Mill, Shaw, Oldham	Marconi-Osram Valve, a subsidiary of GEC	Cotton Mills	CRTs for Radar, radio valves, instruments	Used as an Osram lamp factory, now closed
South Marston, Swindon, Wiltshire	Phillips & Powis Aircraft	Farmland	Aircraft production, largely Miles Master, shadowing Woodley factory	Panattoni Park Swindon industrial estate; previously Honda car plant
Stonehouse, Gloucestershire	Sperry Gyroscope Co. Ltd	Textile Mill	Gyroscopes and instruments	Industrial estate
Stonehouse, Gloucestershire	Hoffmann Ball Bearings	Farmland	Ball bearings for aero engines	Industrial estate
Swaythling, Hampshire	Cunliffe-Owen Aircraft	Farmland	Parts for the Supermarine Spitfire	Ford Southampton plant
Swindon, Wiltshire	Plessey		Electrical components	Plessey
Treforest, South Wales	Smiths Instruments		KLG spark plugs	
Treforest, South Wales	Standard Telephones and Cables		Quartz crystals	
Tubney Wood, Oxfordshire	Nuffield Mechanisation		Bofors guns	
Weston-super-Mare, Somerset	Bristol Aeroplane		Beaufighter	
Yeadon, Leeds, Yorkshire	Avro		Avro York	Leeds Bradford Airport
Ystradgynlais, South Wales	Smiths Instruments		Clocks and watches	

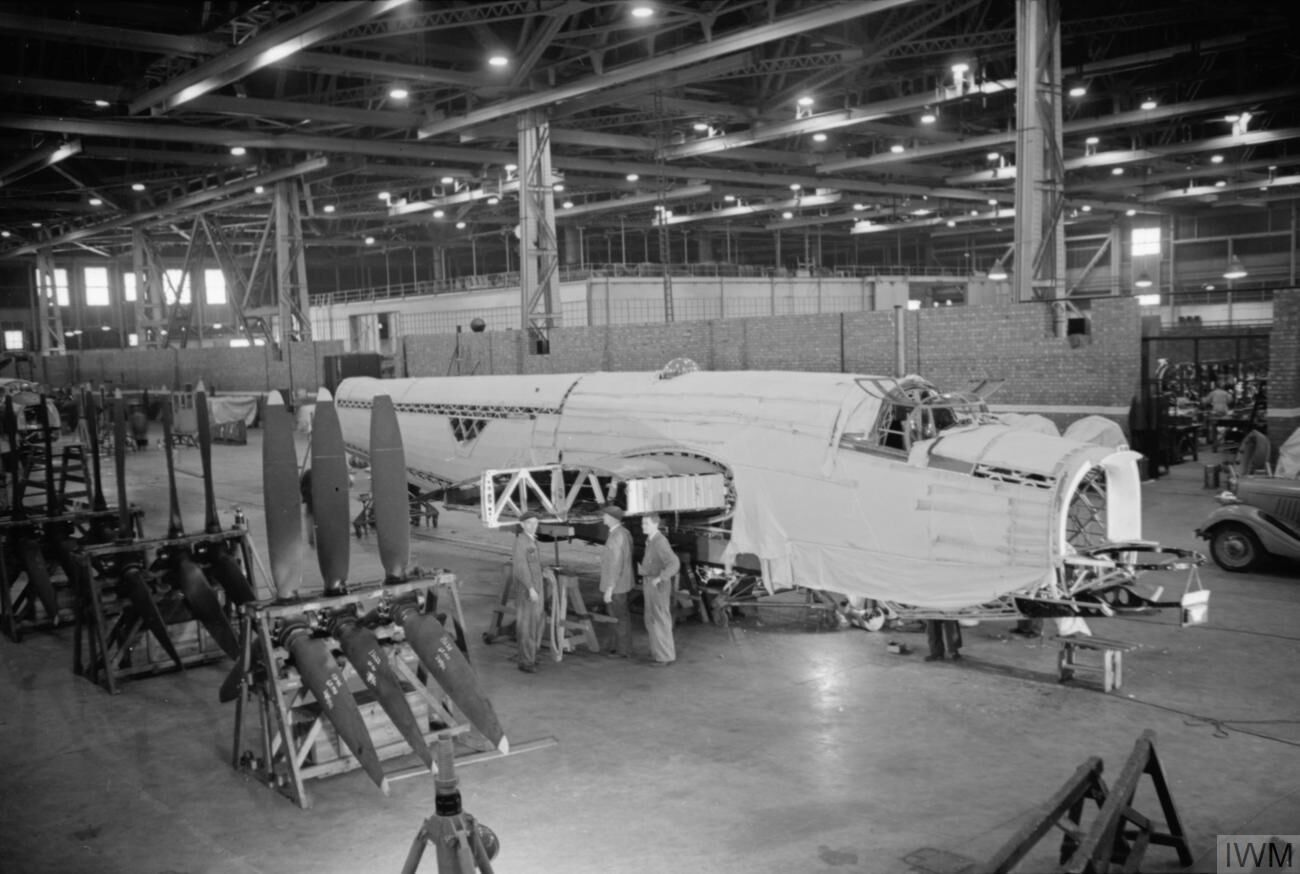
A Wellington bomber under construction at Vickers, Hawarden, near Chester, 1 June 1942

== Extent ==
In June 1939 the response to a question in parliament was: 31 shadow factories were complete or under construction. The Air Ministry was responsible for 16 and, of those 16, 11 were working to full capacity. By that time large numbers of Bristol engines and aircraft were being made in Government owned shadow factories and in the Dominions and other foreign countries.

In February 1944 the Minister for Production, stated in Parliament that there were "in round figures" 175 firms managing agency schemes or shadow factories.

== National Archives catalogue entries ==
Information concerning the shadow factory plan and shadow factories can be found among the following records and descriptive series list code headings held by The National Archives. For the full set of references (including German shadow factories) see the Catalogue below:

Catalogue reference	description
AIR 19/1-10	Shadow scheme and factories, 1935–1940
AIR 20/2395 AIR 20/2396	Shadow factories schemes
AIR 2, code 6/2	Aircraft production, shadow factories
AVIA 15, code 25/1	Factories general
AVIA 15, code 25/5	Shadow factories
T 161/1070	Insurance of Government property managed or maintained by private contractors; `Shadow' factories
T 161/1156	Banking: Shadow factories banking accounts

== See also ==
- Supermarine Spitfire § Production dispersal
