= Hawkins Cookers =

Indian pressure cooker manufacturer

Hawkins Cookers Limited
- Company type: Public company
- Traded as: BSE: 508486
- Industry: Consumer Product Manufacturers
- Founded: 1959 as Pressure Cookers and Appliances Ltd. Changed to Hawkins Cookers Ltd in 1986.
- Founder: H. D. Vasudeva in partnership with L. G. Hawkins & Co. Ltd. (founded in 1921 by Lawrence George Hawkins)
- Headquarters: Mumbai, Maharashtra, India
- Key people: Brahm Vasudeva (Chairman); Subhadip Dutta Choudhury (CEO & VC)
- Products: Pressure Cookers, Futura Cookware
- Brands: Hawkins
- Services: Utensils
- Revenue: ₹4.57 billion (US$48 million)
- Operating income: ₹570 million (US$5.9 million)
- Net income: ₹382.8 million (US$4.0 million)
- Total assets: ₹1.695 billion (US$18 million)
- Total equity: ₹548 million (US$5.7 million)
- Number of employees: 969
- Website: www.hawkinscookers.com

Hawkins Cookers Limited Inc and formerly known as Pressure Cookers and Appliances Ltd, is an Indian company which manufactures pressure cookers and cookware. The company is based in Mumbai and has three manufacturing plants at Thane, Hoshiarpur and Jaunpur. It manufactures under brand names of Hawkins, Futura, Contura, Hevibase, Big Boy, Miss Mary and Ventura. Hawkins is one of the largest pressure cooker manufacturers in India and exports its products to more than 65 countries.

== History ==
Hawkins Cookers was started in 1959 by H. D. Vasudeva as Pressure Cookers and Appliances Ltd, in technical collaboration with L G Hawkins & Co Ltd of England. L G Hawkins and Company Limited was founded by Leonard George Hawkins in 1913 and manufactured home appliances.

The company was initially known as Pressure Cookers and Appliances Ltd and manufactured and marketed of Hawkins pressure cooker under agreement with L G Hawkins & Co Ltd of England. In 1986, the company acquired the present name.

L G Hawkins and Company Limited was bought by Pye Ltd. in 1939. In 1962, Pye acquired Ekco & Co Ltd and L G Hawkins was merged with similar Ekco activities to form Ekco Hawkins and later Ekco Hastings. Pye was later acquired by Philips in 1986. Ekco-Hawkins later became Philips Small Domestic Appliances Product Division and products were rebadged as Philips, but was closed down in the late 1998, due to overseas competition and Philips global rationalization. The Hawkins Universal trademark was acquired by Hawkins Cookers Ltd in 1986 and company name was changed from Pressure Cookers & Appliances Ltd to Hawkins Cookers Ltd.

The company is traded on the Bombay Stock Exchange under the symbol HWKN. It has raised funds through "fixed deposits", a term for high-interest term deposits issued by industrial companies rather than banks.

Hawkins has sold over 110 million pressure cookers worldwide. Today, it makes 88 different models of pressure cookers in 13 different types. All Hawkins pressure cookers are listed by Underwriters Laboratories Inc., USA, an independent institution testing products for public safety. Hawkins pressure cookers feature an inside-fitting lid, which cannot be opened until the steam pressure inside the cooker falls to a safe level. Hawkins was listed as India's most trusted kitchen appliances brand by The Brand Trust Report 2015.
