= Browns Lane plant =

Former car manufacturing site in Coventry, England

Coordinates: 52.4335°N 1.5560°W

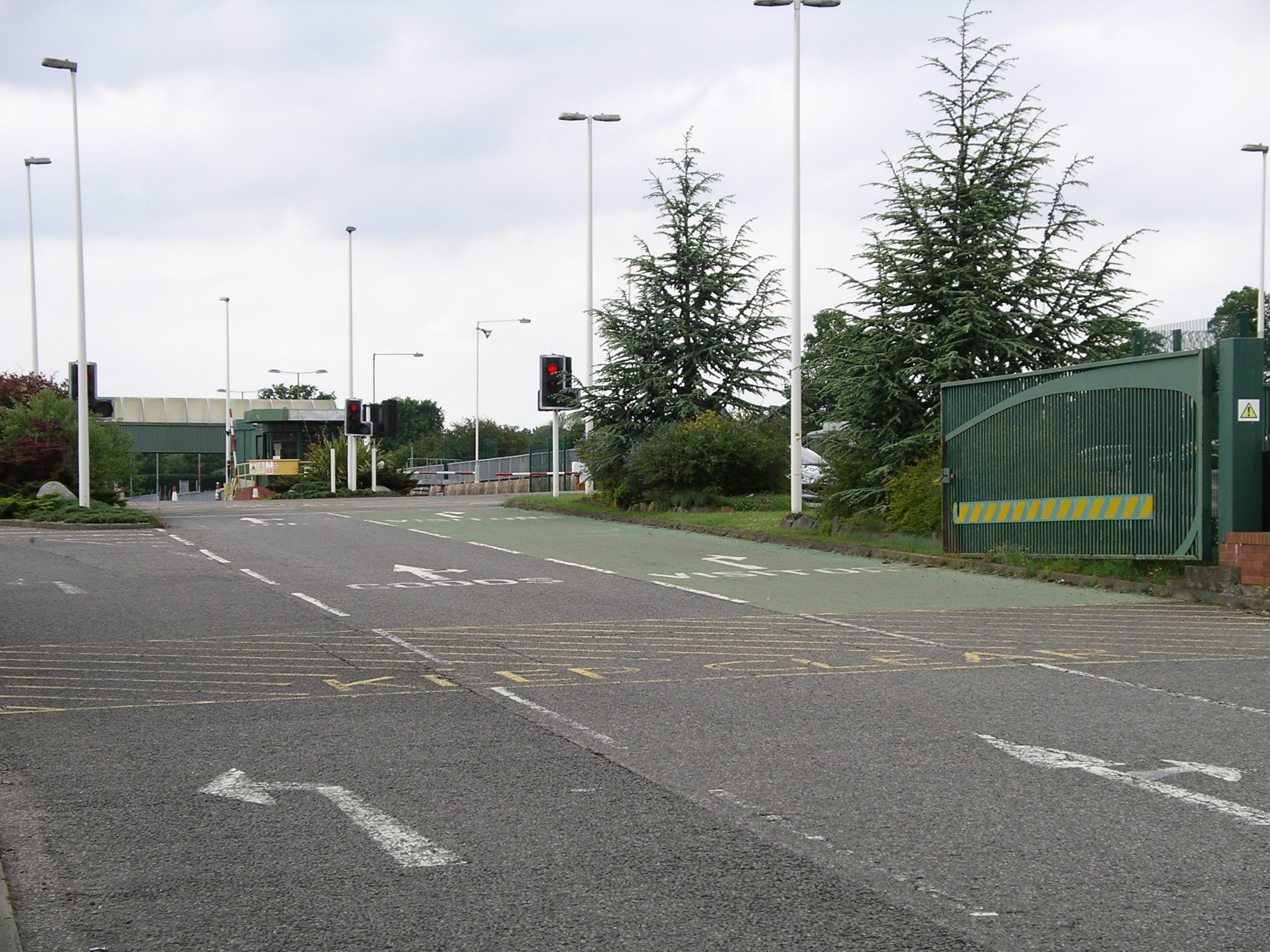
Browns Lane plant from the main gate on Coundon Wedge Drive

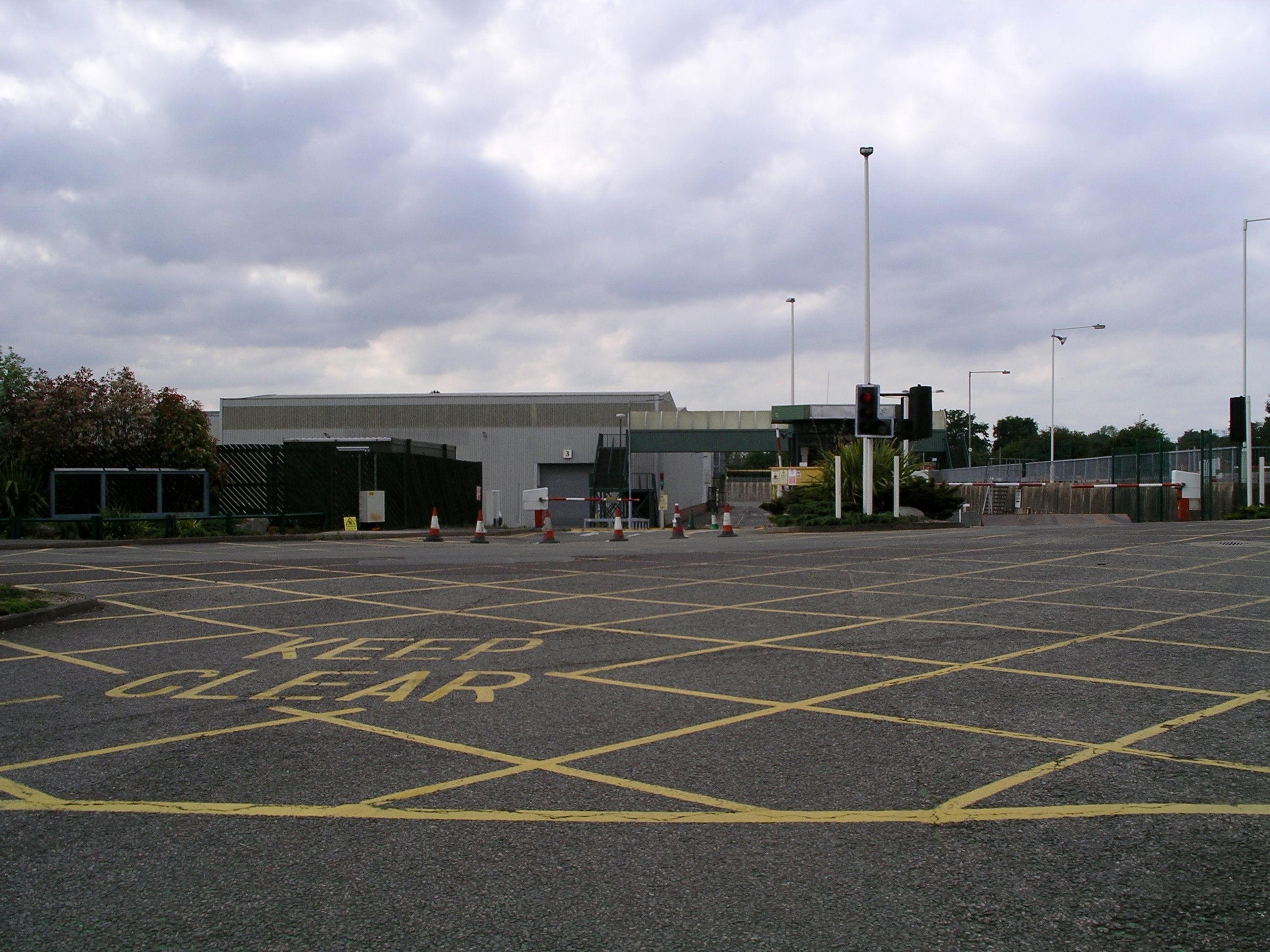
Browns Lane plant

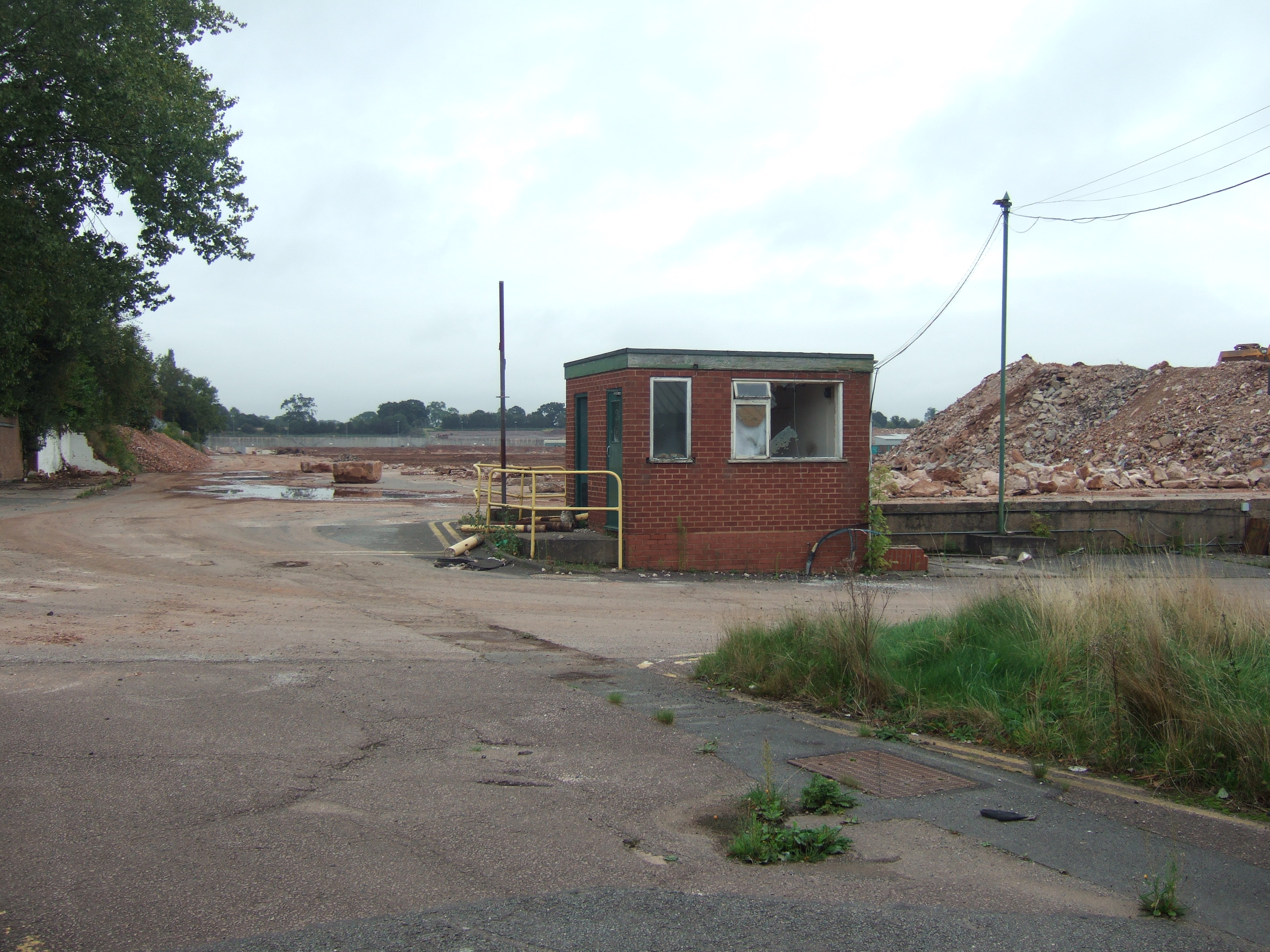
Browns Lane plant demolished

The Browns Lane plant in Coventry, England was built as a Second World War shadow factory run by the Daimler Company. In 1951 it was leased by Jaguar Cars and remained the company's home until 2005. It was the site of all Jaguar production until 1998, when production of the Jaguar S-Type commenced at Castle Bromwich Assembly in Birmingham, which first produced Jaguar cars in 1977. It was also the firm's corporate headquarters and the home of the Jaguar Daimler Heritage Trust.

Jaguar's production at Browns Lane waned over the years, as new models were gradually assigned to Castle Bromwich and the former Ford Halewood Body & Assembly in Halewood, Liverpool. However, the core Jaguar XJ and XK ranges remained on the site until they were moved to Castle Bromwich in 2005. Subsequently, the Browns Lane site housed just the headquarters and museum as well as 500 staff responsible for wood veneering for Jaguar, Aston Martin, and Land Rover. Later, the headquarters moved to the Whitley plant, Whitley, Coventry but the Wood Shop (Veneer Manufacturing Centre), Museum and Pilot Build Workshop remained at Browns Lane. Australian property firm Macquarie Goodman announced its purchase of Browns Lane in 2007. This marked the end of Jaguar's presence at the site after more than 50 years.

The assembly halls were demolished in late 2008.

== Current use ==
In 2010, a portion of the site was purchased by housebuilder Taylor Wimpey.

In 2012, the Browns Lane Jaguar Heritage Museum was demolished. The housing estate which took its place is known as "Swallow's Nest".

Jaguar's Pilot Plant continues in use. A new business park was built on the Browns Lane Plant site called "Lyons Business Park"; access to this site is from Coundon Wedge Drive.

Since 2018, Amazon have operated a receiving centre from the site.
