= L G Hawkins & Co Ltd =

L.G. Hawkins and Company Ltd
- Company type: Private company
- Industry: Home appliance
- Founded: 1913 in London
- Founder: Leonard George Hawkins
- Fate: Acquired by Pye Ltd.
- Successor: Philips
- Products: Home appliances, small appliances, pressure cookers
- Brands: Universal, Hawkins

L G Hawkins & Co was a British company which manufactured small electrical domestic appliances. The company was founded by Leonard George Hawkins in 1913 in London. Initially Leonard George Hawkins imported domestic electrical products from the USA under the ‘Universal’ brand name.

The company was acquired in 1939 by the electronics company Pye which would later become Philips Small Domestic Appliances Product Division, which was closed down in 1998.

== History ==
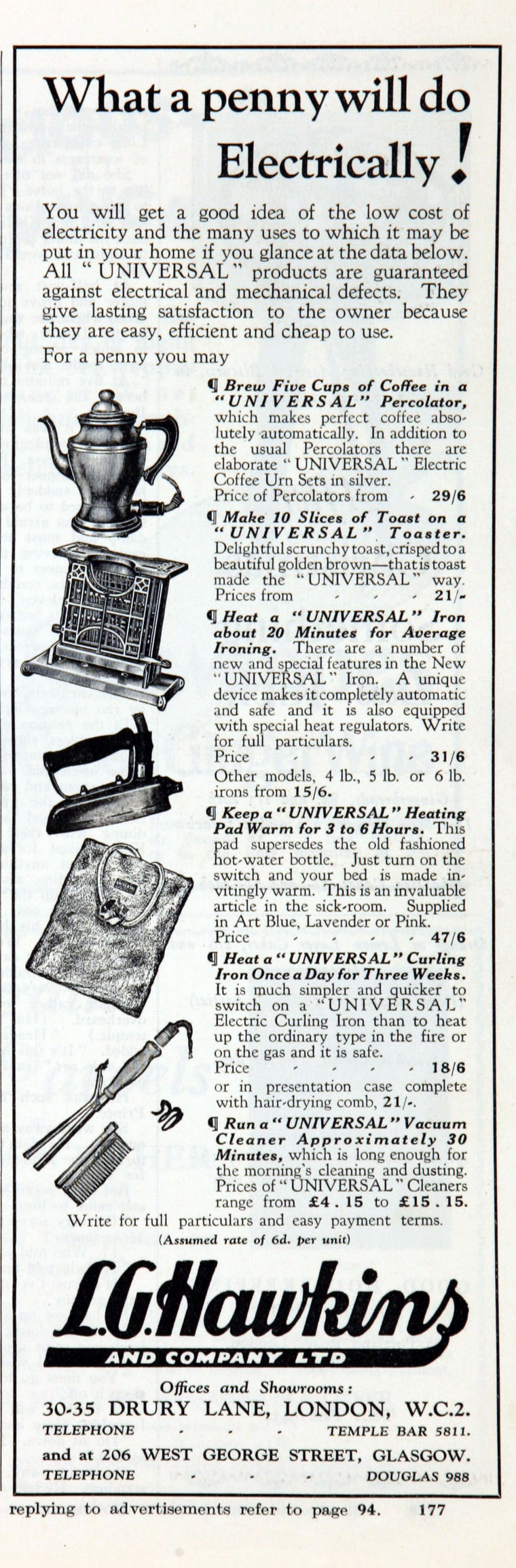
January 1929 – L.G. Hawkins newspaper ad for Universal branded coffee percolator, toaster, electrical iron, heating pad, curling iron and vacuum cleaner.

Leonard George Hawkins started business in 1910. He had visited the United States around 1910 and saw that various electrical consumer goods such as toasters, coffee pots, pressure cookers, etc. had started to come into the domestic market in the U.S. These products were, at that time, not generally available in the U.K. Realizing there was market in the U.K. for such domestic appliances, he started importing products under the Universal brand name in 1911.

During World War I his import business was interrupted as trans-atlantic ships carried only essential war supplies, so the company started manufacturing Universal appliances under license at the London factory. By 1928, the company was manufacturing electrical fixtures, vacuum cleaners, automatic tea makers, coffee percolators, toasters and electric irons. By 1937 the company manufactured sunray fires, kettles and hair dryers and major appliance such as lighting, heating, and washing machines.

L G Hawkins and Company Limited was bought by Pye Ltd. in 1939. In 1962, Pye acquired E.K. Cole Ltd and L G Hawkins was merged with similar Ekco activities to form Ekco Hawkins and later Ekco Hastings. Pye was later acquired by Philips. Ekco-Hawkins later became Philips Small Domestic Appliances Product Division and products were rebadged as Philips, but was closed down in late 1998, due to overseas competition and Philips global rationalization.

The Hawkins Universal trademark was acquired by Hawkins Cookers of India in 1986.
