= Wireless Set No. 46 =

Portable British military radio system

The Wireless Set No. 46 was a HF portable manpack transceiver used by the British Army during World War II. Designed by Ekco for use during beach landings, the set was introduced in 1942. It was a 6 valve set with 3 preset crystal controlled channels, housed in a water-resistant enclosure carried in a webbing pouch. The set was powered by a separate dry cell battery carried in a haversack. The frequency range was between 3.6 and 9.1 MHz depending on the coils and crystals fitted.
