= Castle Bromwich Assembly =

Factory in Castle Vale, Birmingham, England

Coordinates: 52.515°N 1.805°W

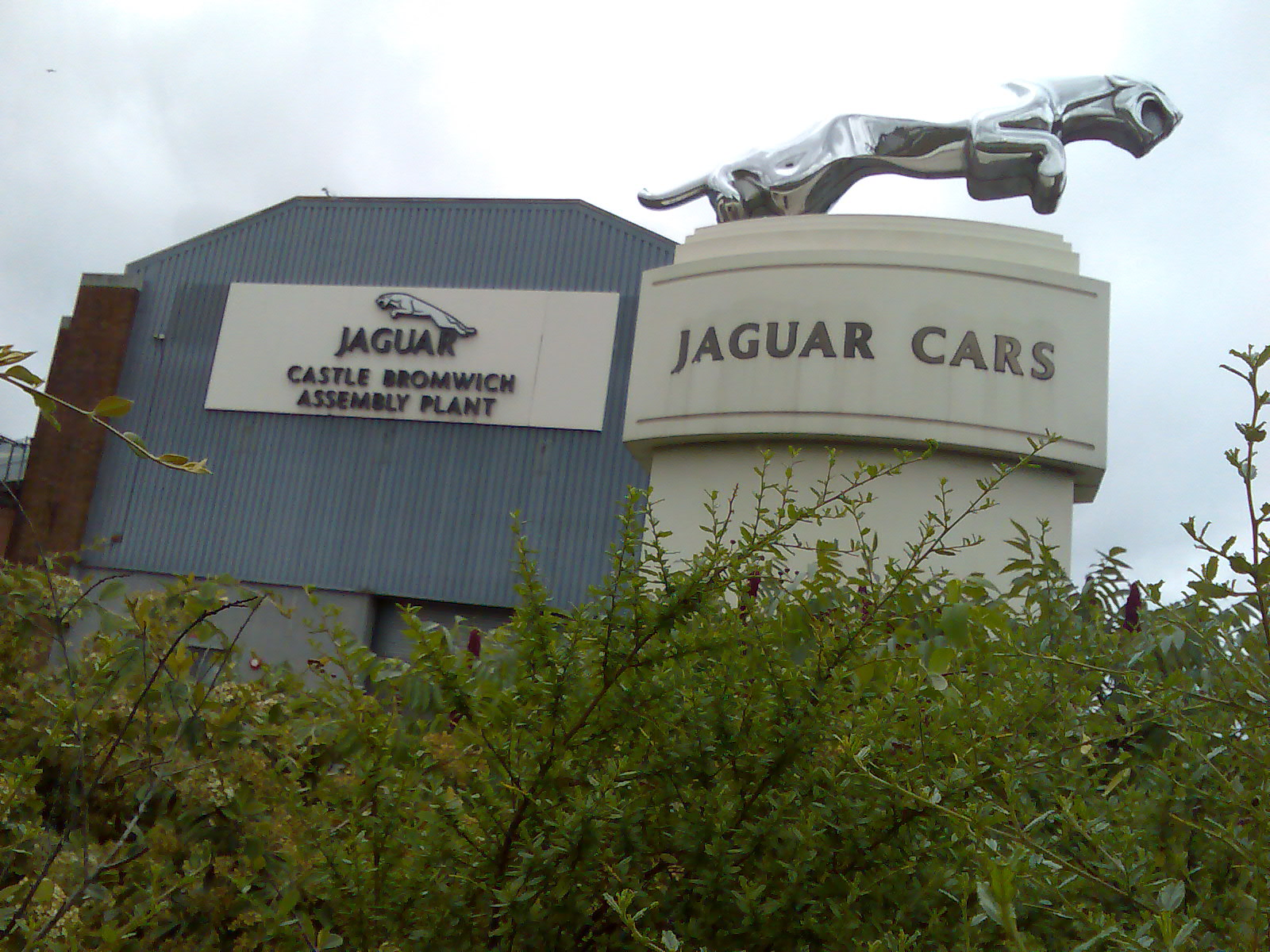
Castle Bromwich Assembly

Castle Bromwich Assembly is a factory owned by Tata Motors. It is located on the Chester Road in Castle Vale, Birmingham, England and employs 3,200 people. The plant is situated on a 110-acre (45 ha) site, with a 60,000 square metres (650,000 sq ft) manufacturing facility. It formerly manufactured all Jaguar saloon and sports cars, prior to production of complete cars at the site concluding in May 2024. After the production of complete cars ended at the site, the factory was modified into making pressed steel panels (that is, body components, not complete cars) for Jaguar cars.

The site was first developed as Castle Bromwich Aircraft Factory (CBAF), a shadow factory for the production of aircraft by the car industry as part of the rearmament of the UK in the pre-Second World War era. After initial problems it was brought under the control of aircraft manufacturers and became one of the largest producers of aircraft during the war.

On Tuesday 24th June 2025, a large fire at the factory was tackled by 50 firefighters.

== History ==
=== Castle Bromwich Aircraft Factory ===
==== Nuffield: 1936–1940 ====
In 1936, the British government had formalised a plan under the Air Ministry called the Shadow factory plan to increase capacity within Britain's aircraft industry. Headed up by automotive pioneer Herbert Austin, the plan was to create nine new factories and add additional capacity and facilities to Britain's existing car manufacturing plants to enable them to quickly turn to aircraft production should the political situation in Europe change towards war.

In 1936, the Air Ministry purchased a parcel of land opposite Castle Bromwich Aerodrome which encompassed an old sewage works. Developed and managed by the Nuffield Organization, owners of Morris Motors, they were briefed to manufacture Supermarine Spitfire fighters and later Avro Lancaster bombers. The theory was that the local Birmingham skills-base and production techniques used in the manufacture of motor vehicles could be transferred to aircraft production.

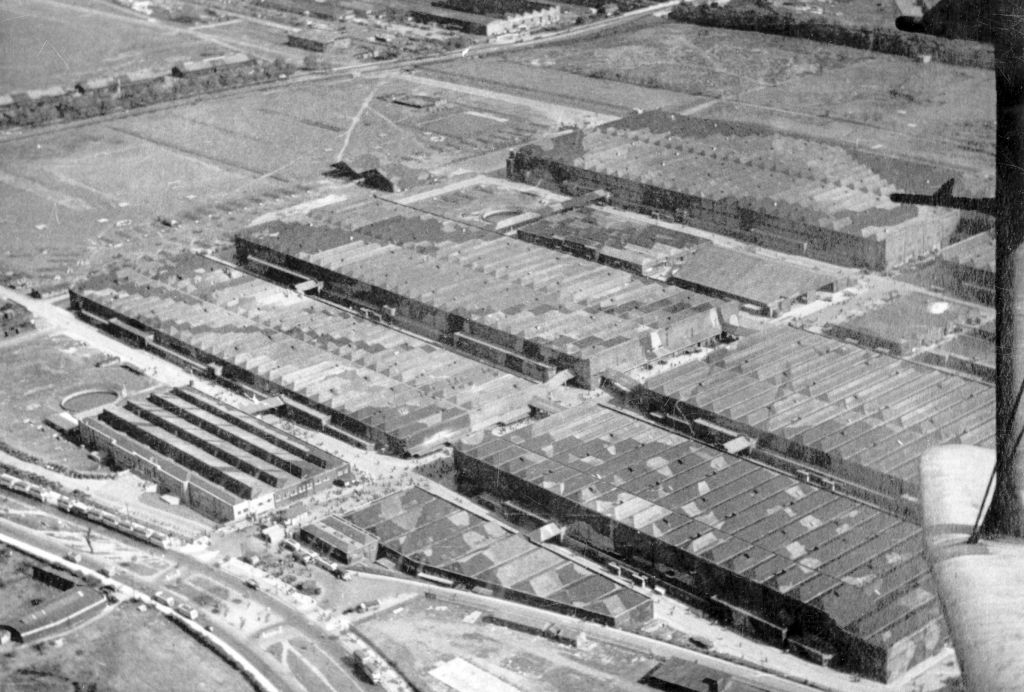
Aerial view of Castle Bromwich Aircraft Factory, heavily camouflaged, 1939-45

CBAF ordered the most modern machine tools then available which were being installed two months after work started on the site. Although Morris Motors under Lord Nuffield (an expert in mass motor-vehicle construction) managed and equipped the factory, it was funded by government money. When the project was first mooted, it was estimated that the factory would be built for £2,000,000, however, by the beginning of 1939, this cost had doubled to over £4,000,000. The Spitfire's stressed-skin construction required precision engineering skills and techniques outside the experience of the local labour force which took some time to train. Aircraft and sub-assemblies were taken across the Chester Road to Castle Bromwich Aerodrome; though early plans included an aerial bridge from E block to the airfield. Very large hangar-like buildings were erected on the east side of the airfield, which were originally referred to as 'Erecting Sheds', where aircraft were prepared for flight testing. They were for the most part referred to by personnel as the 'Flight Sheds'.

CBAF's chief test pilot was Alex Henshaw MBE who managed a team of pilots who had the job of flight-testing the aircraft. The Air Transport Auxiliary were responsible for dispersing tested machines to the Maintenance Units around the country for the fitting of radio-telephones and other equipment. As any build-up of machines on the airfield would be vulnerable to aerial attack, testing was carried out during daylight in almost any weather.

CBAF produced all versions of the Spitfire from the Mk II onwards. This aircraft had the more powerful Rolls-Royce Merlin XII engine, providing 1,150 horsepower (860 kW), an increase of 120 horsepower (89 kW) over the Mk I, and could be used with either the de Havilland or Rotol propellers. The first Mk II flew on 24 September 1939.

However, even as the first Spitfires were being built in June 1940, the factory was still incomplete and there were numerous problems with the factory management which ignored tooling and drawings provided by Supermarine in favour of tools and drawings of its own designs. Meanwhile, the workforce, while not completely stopping production, continually threatened strikes or "slow downs" until their demands for higher than average pay rates were met. By May 1940, Castle Bromwich had not yet built its first Spitfire in spite of promises that the factory would be producing 60 per week starting in April.

Key players, such as Alex Henshaw, viewed the problems as primarily those of poor management during the initial phase. Workers worked twelve-hour on and twelve-hours off until bombings forced a switch to a three-shift, eight-hour system. Henshaw attended the diamond jubilee in 1996 of the founding of the CBAF, hosted by Jaguar Cars Limited in the old factory and remained fulsome in his praise for the workforce until his death.

==== Vickers-Armstrongs: 1940–1945 ====
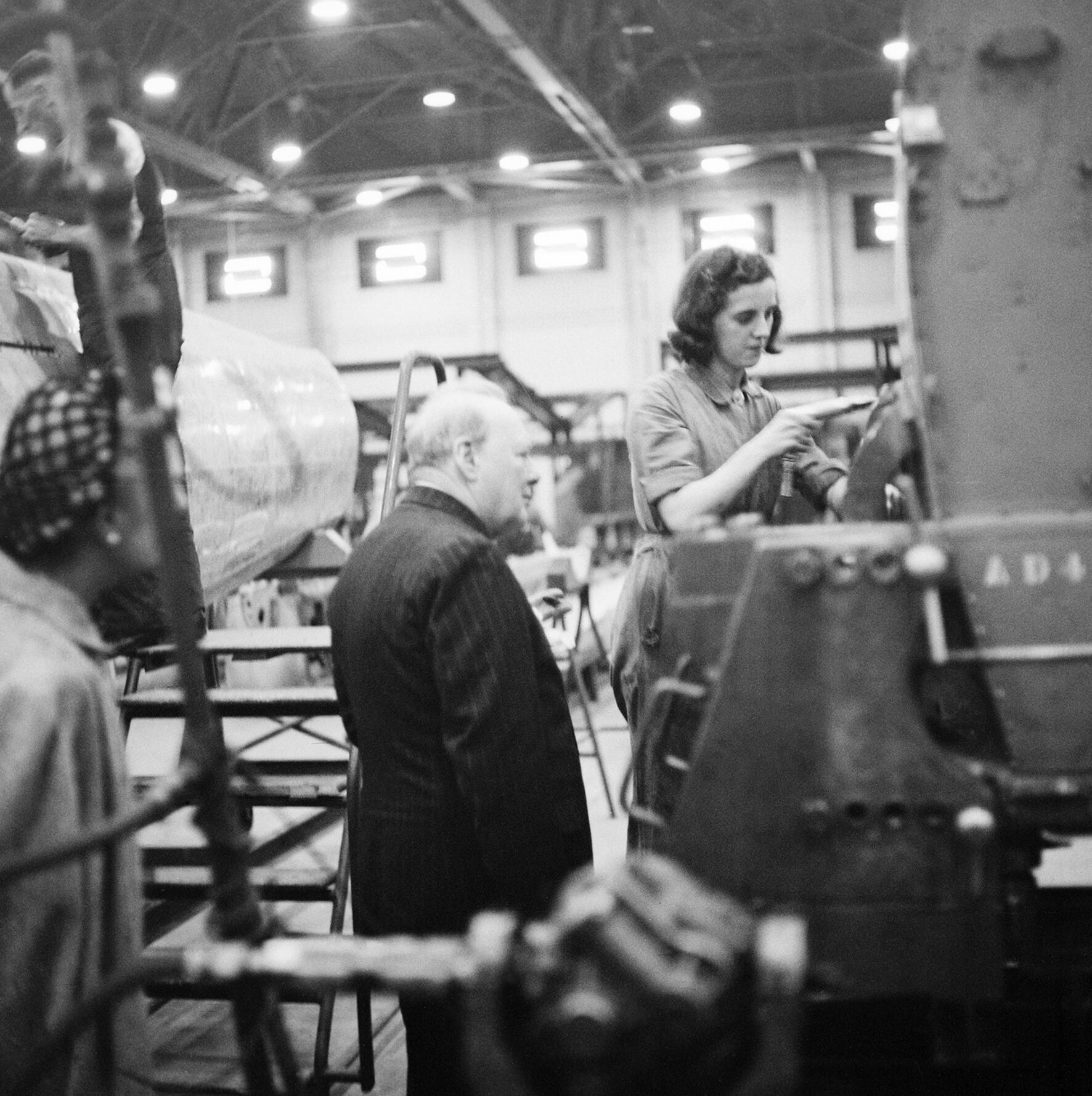
Churchill watches a riveter work on a Spitfire at the factory in 1941.

After the fall of the government of Neville Chamberlain, new Prime Minister Winston Churchill appointed press tycoon Lord Beaverbrook as the Minister of Aircraft Production. On 17 May, Beaverbrook telephoned Nuffield and manoeuvered him into handing over control of the Castle Bromwich plant to Beaverbook's Ministry. Nuffield was furious and reported the incident to Churchill, but Beaverbrook countered by sending in aircraft expert Sir Richard Fairey who wrote a secret report which detailed how expensive machinery had been unused, the assembly line in chaos, and the employees not doing their work:

Labour is in a very bad state. Discipline is lacking. Men are leaving before time and coming in late, taking evenings off when they think fit. In parts of the factory I noticed that the men did not even stir themselves at the approach of the Works Manager. The labour in the Midlands is not “playing the game”. They are getting extra money and are not working in proportion for it.

Beaverbrook, who had disturbed the Air Ministry by agreeing with the vision of Air Vice Marshal Hugh Dowding that Britain at that time needed defensive fighters over attacking bombers, immediately cancelled all Castle Bromwich contracted bombers, which at that point included the Handley-Page Halifax and the Vickers Wellington. He then sent in experienced management staff and workers from Supermarine, and gave over control of the factory to Vickers-Armstrongs (Supermarine's parent company). Although it would take some time to resolve the problems, CBAF achieved full production in June 1940, when 10 Spitfire Mk IIs were built; 23 in July; 37 in August; and 56 in September. No. 611 Squadron at RAF Digby the first squadron to receive the Mk II in August 1940, notably late in the Battle of Britain.

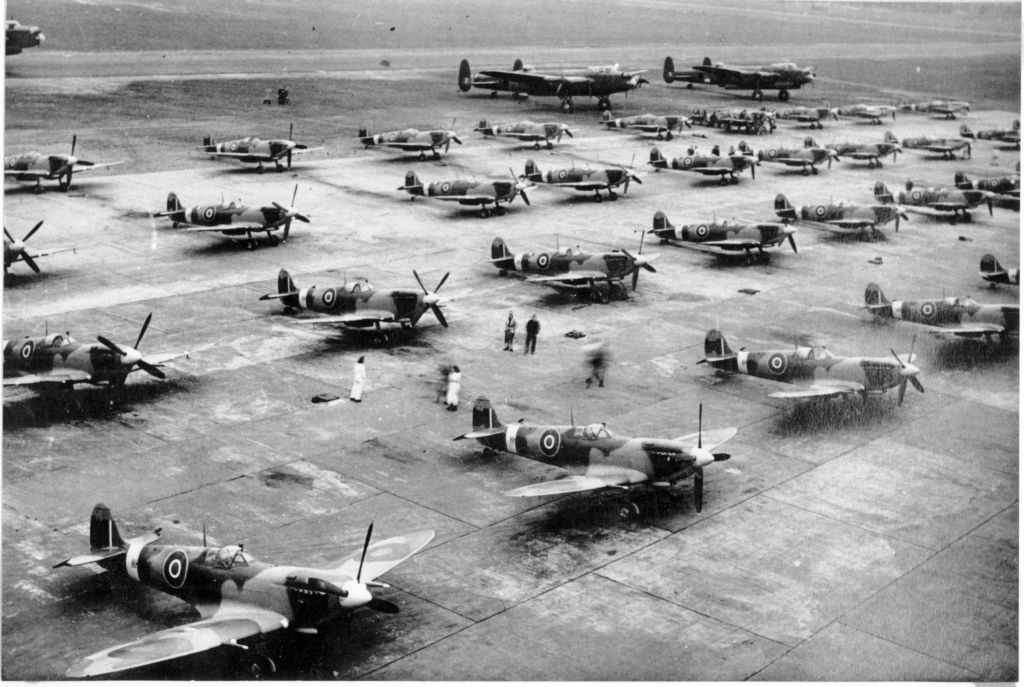
Factory-fresh Spitfires and Lancasters, lined up for flight testing and delivery to operational units, Castle Bromwich, 1944

The wisdom of the shadow factory scheme was demonstrated in September 1940, when the Supermarine factory in Southampton was bombed, and production there temporarily stopped. CBAF went on to become the largest and most successful plant of its type during the 1939–45 conflict. As the largest Spitfire factory in the UK, by producing a maximum of 320 aircraft per month, it built over half of the approximately 20,000 aircraft of this type. By the time production ended at Castle Bromwich in June 1945, a total of 12,129 Spitfires (921 Mk IIs, 4,489 Mk Vs, 5,665 Mk IXs, and 1,054 Mk XVIs) had been built.

Subsequently receiving an order for 200 production aircraft, the first CBAF Lancaster was flown on 22 October 1943 by Alex Henshaw. Given the airframe number HK535 and fitted with Merlin 22 engines, it was issued to No. 463 Squadron Royal Australian Air Force. It was lost on a raid over Lille, France, during the night of 10/11 May 1944. Production of Lancasters reached a peak of 25 in December 1944, a record for the quantity produced anywhere.

The film Jane Brown Changes Her Job (1941) was made in the factory, and scenes for the 1943 film Millions Like Us were shot there, with employees serving as extras.

Some original wartime features can still be seen such today, such as the faded remains of green camouflage paint. This can still be seen on the top of some older production buildings, such as F Block, that is now used as trim and final assembly for the Jaguar XJ. Close inspection will also reveal that all the cast-iron hoppers of the factory's rainware have a winged-roundel motif cast into them. At the Jubilee celebrations in 1997, a plaque was unveiled by Alex Henshaw just inside the old wartime main gates to the factory site. At the moment of unveiling, ex-Red Arrows founder Ray Hanna made a single pass over the ceremony in a Spitfire MkIX, MH434. This aircraft was not only built at the CBAF, but was test-flown by Henshaw himself. The aircraft had been specially named for the occasion by Henshaw at Elmdon Airfield (now called Birmingham International Airport). After the unveiling, both Henshaw and Hanna attended a celebratory luncheon with many local dignitaries and many former CBAF employees. The whole event was supported and funded by Jaguar Cars Ltd.

=== 1945–1977 ===
The first postwar owners were Fisher and Ludlow, having themselves been bombed out of their inner-city factory. Fisher and Ludlow (later Pressed Steel Fisher) were a car body pressings sub-contractor for most of the (now mainly defunct) British Motor Corporation and later British Leyland marques, the last of these being Jaguar, which took outright control of the factory in 1977, seven years before being floated off from British Leyland.

=== Jaguar Cars/Jaguar Land Rover: 1977 to present ===
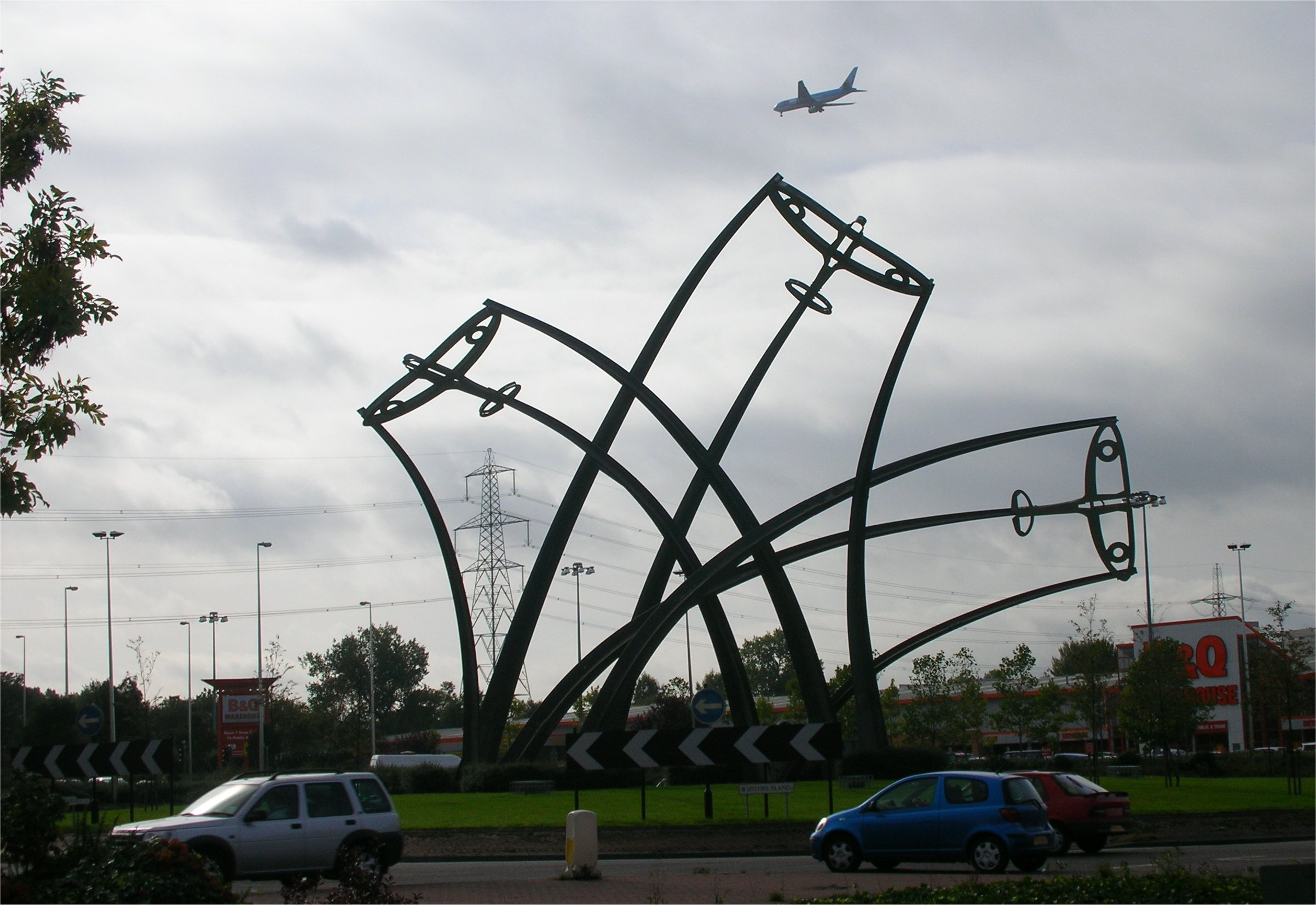
Sentinel sculpture on nearby roundabout

Taken over by Jaguar Cars, the facility transferred to Ford upon its takeover of Jaguar in 1990, and then in 2008 to Tata Motors as part of Jaguar Land Rover.

Soon after the takeover, Tata Motors announced that it would close either the Castle Bromwich Assembly plant or Land Rover's Lode Lane plant in Solihull. In March 2010 it was reported that Tata Motors might reconsider plant closures, but on 19 April 2010 Tata Motors announced it would go ahead and close one factory. On 15 October 2010 it was announced that an agreement had been made between Jaguar Land Rover management and union bosses to save all three Jaguar Land Rover production plants from closure. Jaguar Land Rover had agreed that all plants would remain open until at least 2020 in a deal with the Unite the Union, which represented the majority of salaried production employees.

In mid-June 2019, workers at the plant voted to move to a four-day week amid a £2.5bn cost-cutting drive. The offer by the employees was intended to help "attract new models and increase job security" since manufacturing of the XJ was to end in July.

Weeks later, on 5 July 2019, JLR announced its intention to build a new electric XJ saloon, replacing the manufacturing of the conventional Jaguar XJ (X351) at Castle Bromwich, "safeguarding the jobs of 2,500 people" (or 2,700 people, according to BBC News). Manufacturing of the new model was expected to start in autumn 2019, after an investment of £1bn in upgrades to the facility. A BBC report indicated that the plant "also produces the Jaguar XF, XE and F-Type" as of mid-2019, but the XJ was essential for the continuation of the manufacturing facility. Without the new electric model, the Castle Bromwich plant would "effectively be dead", according to David Bailey, a professor of business economics at Birmingham Business School.

During the coronavirus pandemic, operations at Castle Bromwich Assembly were suspended temporarily on a few occasions.

In May 2024 the production of complete cars at the site ended, with the factory becoming a component manufacturer (pressed steel body panels) for Jaguar cars built elsewhere.

== Product history ==
The facility handled body-stamping operations, body assembly, paint and trim, and final assembly for all Jaguar saloon and sports cars. The following models were built at the Castle Bromwich plant until end of production of complete cars at the site in 2024.

- Jaguar XE
- Jaguar XF
- Jaguar F-Type
- Jaguar XK
- Jaguar XJ
- Jaguar S-Type
