= Cowbridge House =

Country house in Wiltshire, England

Coordinates: 51.5770°N 2.0833°W

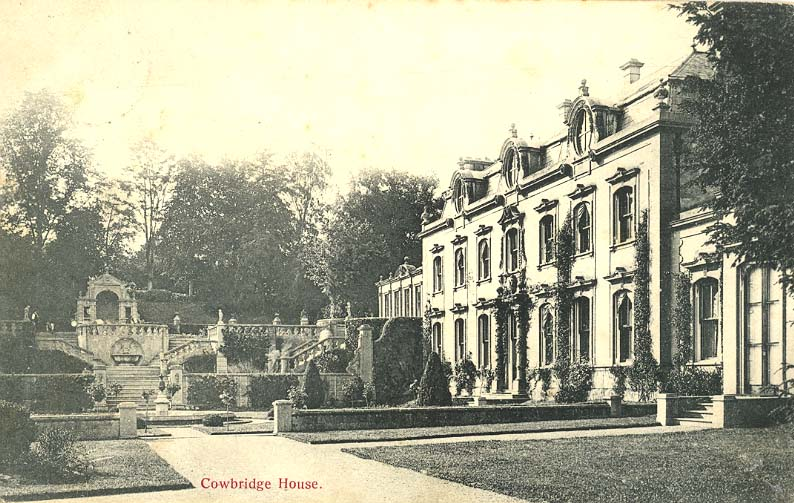
Cowbridge House on a 1905 postcard

Cowbridge House, 3/4 mile (1.2 km) southeast of Malmesbury, Wiltshire, England, was an 18th-century country house that was demolished in 2007.

During the Second World War, the EKCO company used the house as a shadow factory for the manufacture of radar equipment. The factory continued after the war, producing radio and telecommunications equipment; the company was taken over by Pye TMC and then Philips, and later became part of AT&T. The site was in use as offices until 2004 when the owners, Lucent Technologies, moved their operations to Swindon. Subsequently the site was redeveloped for housing.
