= Fisher and Ludlow =

British car body manufacturing company

Fisher and Ludlow was a British car body manufacturing company based in Castle Bromwich, Birmingham.

== Operation ==
A high volume operation, Fisher and Ludlow built finished and trimmed car bodies which were then trucked to the "manufacturer"'s works to be fitted with all the mechanicals.

== Ownership ==
It was acquired by the British Motor Corporation (BMC) in 1953. After the merger of BMC and Pressed Steel Company (PSC) in 1966, and the formation of the British Leyland Motor Corporation (BLMC) in 1968, the Fisher & Ludlow business was merged with the PSC business to form Pressed Steel Fisher under BLMC.
