= EKCO =

British electrical and plastics manufacturer

E. K. Cole Limited
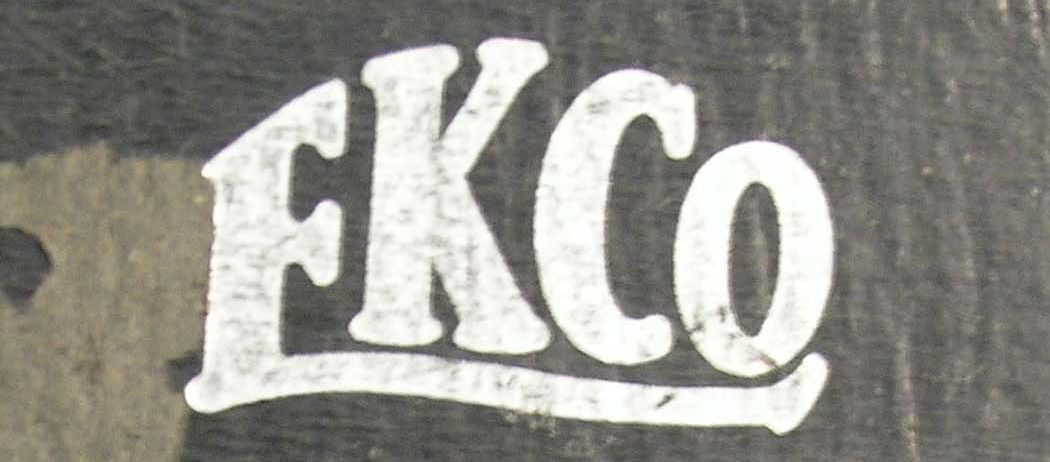
- Traded as: EKCO
- Industry: Electronics and Plastics
- Founded: 1924 in Southend-on-Sea, United Kingdom
- Founder: Eric Kirkham Cole
- Defunct: Electronics early 1970s. Plastics in 1986.
- Fate: Merger with Pye
- Successor: Philips
- Headquarters: Priory Crescent, Southend-on-Sea, United Kingdom
- Number of locations: 9
- Key people: David Harman Powell; Martyn Rowland
- Products: Radio; Television; Plastics; Radar; Heating; Lighting
- Brands: Ferranti; Dynatron
- Number of employees: 8,000
- Parent: 1960-1963 British Electronic Industries; 1963-1967 Pye of Cambridge; 1967-1978 Philips (via Pye Holdings); 1978-1986 Courtaulds
- Subsidiaries: EKCO Electronics; Ecko-Ensign; Ecko Plastics; Egen Electrical; Ekco Instrumentation

EKCO (abbreviated from Eric Kirkham Cole Limited) was a British electronics company founded by Eric Kirkham Cole CBE in Southend-on-Sea during 1924. The company started out by making radio sets, before progressing onto television sets and lighting. The company's knowledge of radio saw it expand into developing radar before and during World War II. The company expanded into making its own plastic bodies for radio sets, with EKCO Plastics later becoming a manufacturer of domestic wares. The company merged in 1960 with Pye to become British Electronic Industries Ltd, which was purchased by Dutch firm Philips in 1967, with the EKCO brand disappearing from brown goods during the 1970s.

== Early history ==
The company's founder Eric Kirkham Cole was born in July 1901 at Prittlewell, Southend-on-Sea, Essex, and was educated at Southend Day Technical School, followed by a three-year apprenticeship. He joined his father's business in fitting electrics to houses. Cole and his future wife Muriel Bradshaw started out making radio sets in 1922 in a rented room in Westcliff-on-Sea, at a rate of about six a week, which were all battery powered as per the norm at the time.

William Streatfield Verrells, a schoolmaster and freelance journalist from Southend-on-Sea, wrote an article in a local newspaper asking if it was possible to power a radio set from the mains electricity supply rather than batteries. Cole saw a possible business opportunity and set about building his battery eliminator, the H.T. Eliminator, which he later demonstrated to Verrells. Suitably impressed, Verrells joined Cole in a business venture, with Cole manufacturing the battery eliminators, and Verrells marketing them with both Cole, Verrells and Bradshaw selling sets by knocking on doors in the town that had a radio aerial outside their property. Cole married Muriel in 1925 and they would go onto have two boys.

In 1926 a private company E. K. Cole Ltd was formed with Verrells as chairman and Cole as vice-chairman, and were joined on the board by local businessmen Mr Maxwell, the owner of Peter Pans Playground, builder Mr Manners and milkman Mr Pring. With the extra funding that was raised, the company set up a new factory behind 803-805 London Road, Leigh-on-Sea in 1927, employing around 50 people. After further expansion, E. K. Cole Ltd became a public limited company in 1930, and moved to a spacious new factory called the Ekco Works at Priory Crescent, Southend-on-Sea, the first large factory in Britain intended specifically for manufacturing radio receivers. The company also began to concentrate on the manufacture of mains powered radios rather than battery eliminators which were becoming obsolete, bringing in John Wyborn from Marconiphone as their chief engineer and Michael Lipman as production engineer. The company was also revolutionary in using Bakelite for its radio cases instead of wood, which was the norm.

The company suffered a major financial setback in 1932, when a fire swept through its research and development laboratories. The blaze destroyed much of the design work for the company's new range of receivers.

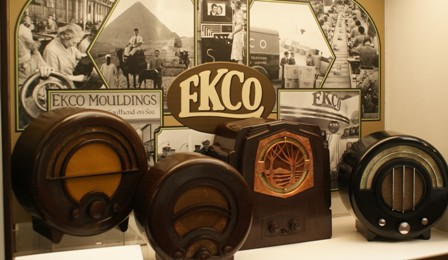
Architect-designed EKCO bakelite radios from the 1930s from the collection of Southend Museums

Ekco launched its first car radio at the 1934 Radiolympia exhibition. Another important development for the company was the introduction of bakelite cabinets for its radios. Initially these cabinets were made for the company in Germany by AEG, however the introduction of high import duties on the cabinets in 1931 led Ekco to establish its own bakelite moulding shop adjacent to its Southend-on-Sea works. The company employed architects such as Serge Chermayeff and Wells Coates to design its bakelite radio cabinets. By 1934, the company had a turnover of more than £1 million.

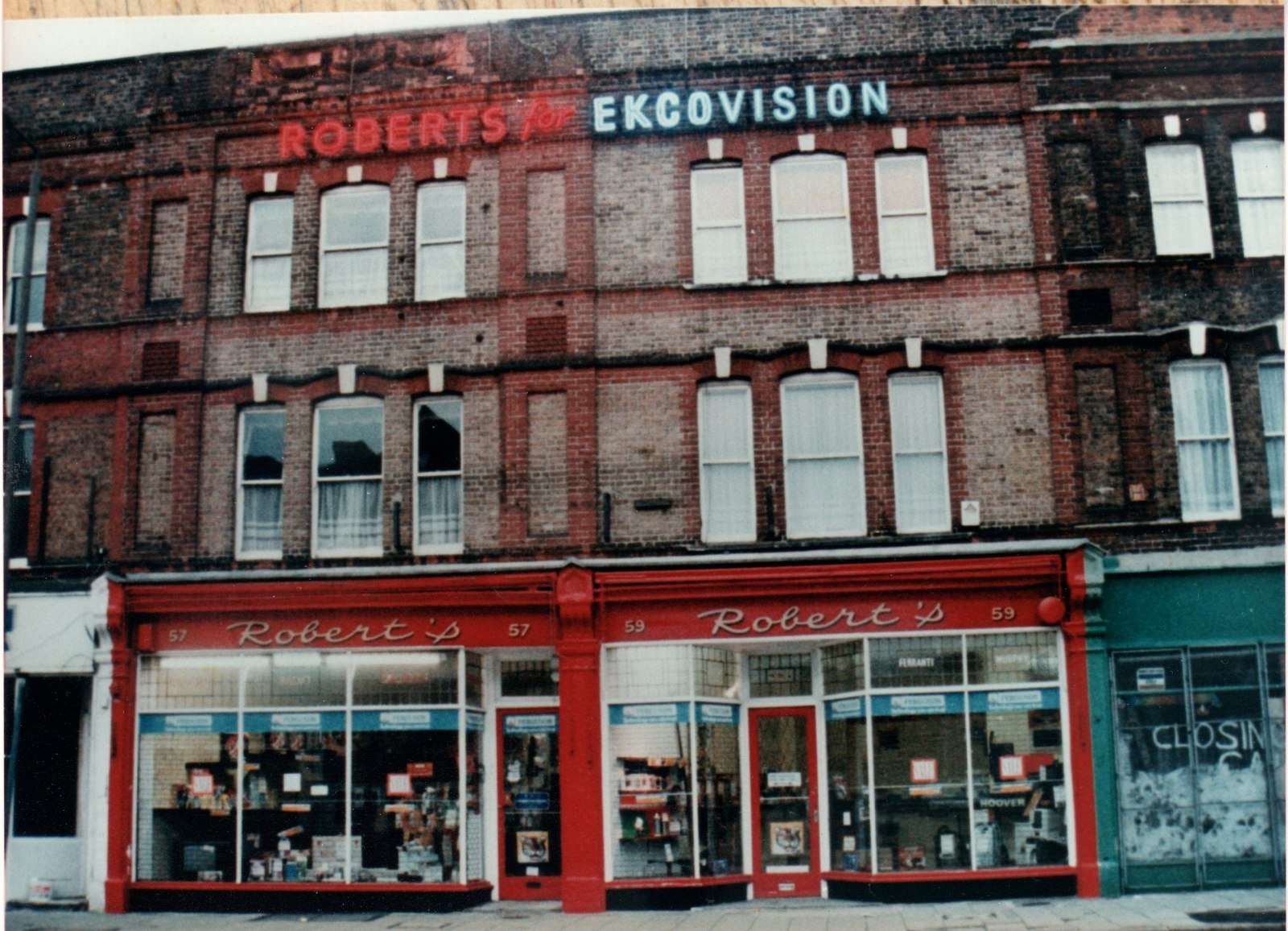
Ekcovision television signage in Balham, South London, 1985

In 1935 Ekco made a substantial investment in Scophony Limited, the developers of the Scophony projection television system. Although the system showed great promise, its development was halted by the Second World War, and not resumed postwar. In 1936, Ekco and Marconi set up Marconi-Ekco Instruments as a jointly owned company to combine their activities in measuring instruments, diathermy, and electro-medical apparatus with premises at Southend and Chelmsford. In 1941, Eric Kirkham Cole announced that they had sold their share in the business to Marconi.

== World War II ==
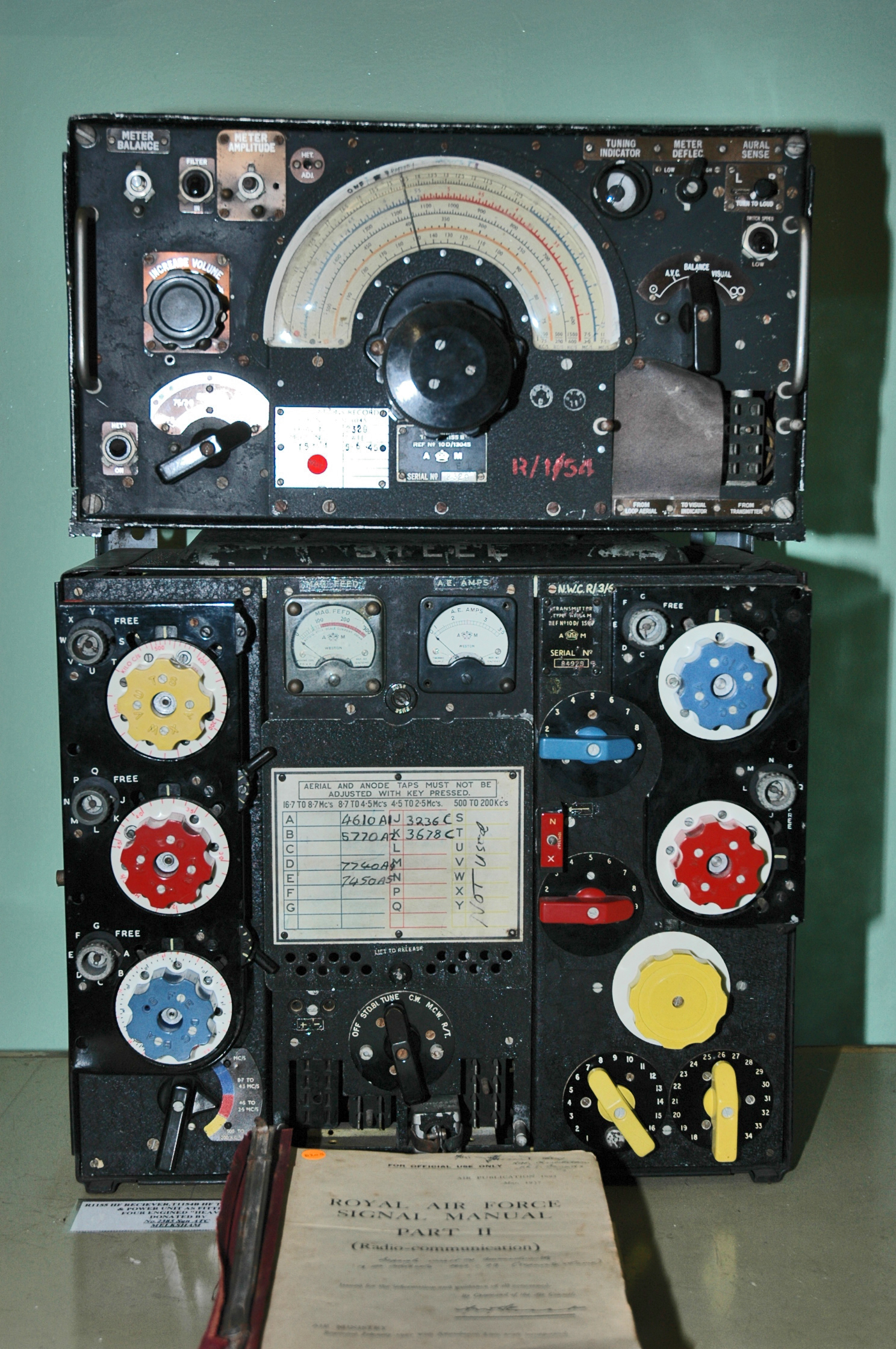
R1155 receiver on top of T1154 transmitter

Before the start of the Second World War, the Government decided to disperse certain production to locations away from obvious bombing targets. This led to a shadow factory at Cowbridge House, Malmesbury, Wiltshire, being established by Ekco. This was followed by other shadow factories at Aylesbury, Woking, Preston, and Rutherglen. The wartime headquarters of Ekco was based at Aston Clinton House in Buckinghamshire. Following the outbreak of war, the Southend-on-Sea factory was evacuated apart from the bakelite moulding shop whose large moulding presses could not be moved easily. Less than a year later, the empty factory was re-equipped to make wiring looms for aircraft such as the Avro Lancaster.

Malmesbury specialised in the top-secret development and production of the new radar systems as part of the "Western Development Unit". Radar equipment produced at Malmesbury during the war included the AI Mk. IV and AI Mk. VIII air interception radars, and the ASV Mk. II air to surface vessel radar.

In addition to radar equipment, Ekco also manufactured the ubiquitous R1155 and T1154 aircraft radios at its Aylesbury shadow factory. Ekco carried out extensive development work on both units before putting them into production, significantly improving on the original Marconi design. The R1155 and T1154 were also produced by Marconi, Plessey, and EMI. The company also manufactured the Wireless Set No. 19 tank radio at Woking. It was a Pye designed set made by several other British and American companies. In 1942, Ekco began production of its Wireless Set No. 46 portable man-pack radio, and large numbers of these were made at the company's Woking and Southend-on-Sea factories.

In 1943, Sir Stafford Cripps, then minister of aircraft production, described Ekco as "one of the best, if not the best, units in the country producing wireless apparatus".

== Post-war ==
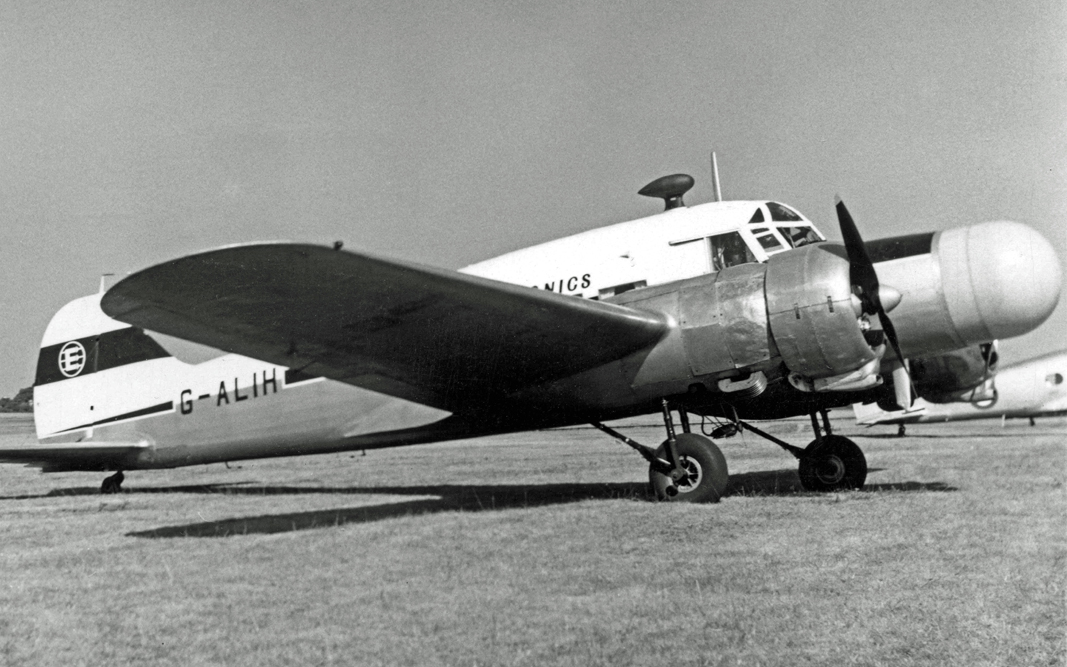
Ekco Electronics Avro Anson XI at Blackbushe Airport in 1954, the company's trademark on its tail

It is estimated that by 1945 EKCO had over 8,000 people working for it across various sites making mains and portable TVs, mains and portable radios, radiograms, tape recorders, car radios, electric heaters, and electric blankets. In 1947, the company introduced the Wireless Set No. 88 VHF man-pack transceiver for use by the British Army.

Ekco bought the Dynatron business in 1954 and the Ferranti brown goods brand in 1957 (though not Ferranti's heavy industries, defence electronics or meter businesses). The company also had a component subsidiary, Egen Electrics, on Canvey Island.

=== Radar and instrumentation ===
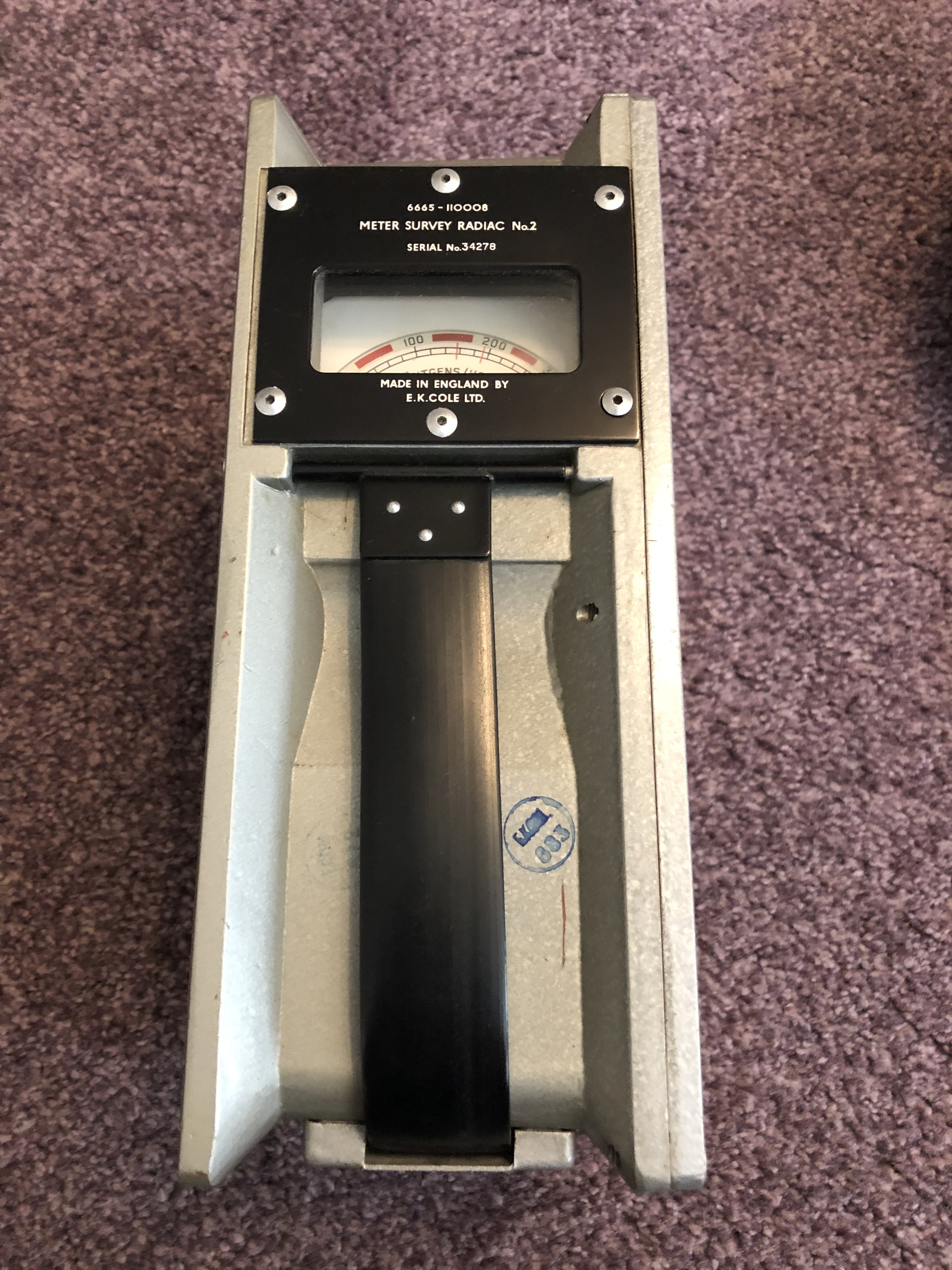
EKCO-manufactured ionisation chamber radiation survey meter

In the early 1950s, a new subsidiary Ekco Electronics Ltd, was created to manage the development of radar and instrumentation manufactured at both Malmesbury (radar) and Southend (instrumentation). During the 1950s, the company produced a number of military radar systems including the ARI 5820 ranging radar for the Hawker Hunter; the ASV Mk. 19 air to surface vessel radar for the Fairey Gannet, and the Red Steer tail warning radar for the Avro Vulcan. EKCO also supplied weather radars for a variety of civil aircraft such as the Bristol Britannia, De Havilland Comet, Vickers Vanguard, Vickers VC10 and BAC 111. The instrumentation department produced some of the first control systems for Britain's nuclear power stations, while other instruments included nucleonic gauges. In 1960, a new factory was opened in Rochford, with the manufacture and development departments at Southend and Malmesbury being relocated to the new site.

Westland Sea King helicopters used the Ekco AW391 search radar, while the company also made the E390/564 weather radar for the Concorde and BOAC Boeing 747 fleet. The Rochford factory was sold to Lesney Products in 1968, with a works being transferred back to the Ekco Works at Southend. In 1970, EKCO's radar activities were subsumed into MEL, the military electronics subsidiary of Philips.

=== Plastic moulding ===
The company began to use injection moulding to make plastic radio cases in 1947, and expanded into making plastic parts for other manufacturers. By the mid to late 1950s, E. K. Cole had grown to be one of the largest producers of industrial plastics in Europe, purchasing companies such as Kilgore in 1955. Ekco Plastics Limited was formed in 1956 as a wholly owned subsidiary. In 1959, the largest plastic injection moulding machine in Great Britain was installed in the factory. The new moulding machine allowed Ekco to produce single mouldings for Frigidaire for the first time.

Ekco Plastics was based at Priory Crescent, Southend. They developed a range of plastic consumer products, beginning with the 'Superbath' baby bath, designed by Martyn Rowland who would later design the Trimphone. The bath won a Council of Industrial Design award in 1958. The company provided 800 slimline toilet seats for the cruise ship SS Oriana in 1959, with many hotels and public organisations ordering their products. David Harman Powell, who had attended the Southend School of Art and had previously worked for EKCO, was appointed as chief industrial designer in 1960 after a spell with British Industrial Plastics. The company were producing over a million plastic mouldings a week by 1960. In 1964, under Pye of Cambridge ownership, Ekco Plastics introduced a range of containers under the 'Eckoware' brand name. In 1968, David Harman Powell's Nova tableware won the Duke of Edinburgh award for elegant design with the judges commenting on its "practical qualities of convenience and durability with shapes and colours of precision and elegance". In 1970, Harman Powell's design for disposable cutlery won the Design Council of Industrial Design Award for Consumer Orientated Products.

Pye Holdings sold Ecko Plastics to National Plastics, a subsidiary of Courtaulds, in 1978 for £875,000. NP Ekco, as the subsidiary was called, was sold to Linpac in 1986. Linpac became Ecomold, but closed the factory after it fell into administration in 2008.

=== Heating and appliances ===
Ekco started making Thermotube tubular heaters at Malmesbury in 1940. The company would develop further products including electric blankets, Panelec solid embedded floor warming system, Greenhouse heating, Teamakers and Hostess trolleys. In 1962, Ekco merged with Pye subsidiary L G Hawkins & Co Ltd to form Ekco Hawkins. The production was moved to Hawkins factory in Hastings, with the company later being renamed Ekco Hastings. The company later became part of Philips small electrical appliance department.

=== Ekco-Ensign ===
In the late 1930s, Ekco began producing its own radio valves at its Southend-on-Sea works. Following the company's decision to abandon the venture, the plant was converted to a lamp factory. In 1943, Ekco acquired Ensign Lamps based in Preston. In 1950, Ekco sold 51% of its lighting subsidiary, Ekco-Ensign Electric Ltd, to Thorn Electrical Industries.

== Merger and restructuring ==
Ekco merged with Pye in 1960 to form a new holding company, British Electronic Industries Ltd, with C.O. Stanley as chairman and E. K. Cole as vice-chairman. The following year Cole resigned from the board and retired. He died on 18 November 1966 in the Bahamas due to a bathing accident, his wife Muriel having predeceased him in 1965. In 1961, Ekco formed two companies, Ekco TV and Radio and Ekco Heating and Electrical to market their products.

British Electronic Industries became Pye of Cambridge in 1963, was put up for sale in 1966, and in the same year Pye closed the Southend-on-Sea factory (but maintained its car radio repair workshop until 1977) as part of its restructuring plan. Philips Electrical Industries attempted to purchase the business but was blocked from buying the company outright by the then Trade Secretary Tony Benn, and would only allow them to purchase 60% of the shareholding. Philips created Pye Holdings to manage the group, and in 1976 completed the purchase of the remaining shares. By the early 1970s, the Ekco brand had all but disappeared from electronic products.

== Legacy ==
The main factory at Southend-on-Sea was, after being sold to the Access credit card company, demolished to make way for a housing development. The Ekco name lives on within the development, and the site still hosts the Ekco Social and Sports Club, while the clubs football team Ekco Park F.C. still carry the name. A statue of Eric Cole was commissioned for the housing development in 2020.

The EKCO brand was bought by Chinese company International Audio Group in 2009.

Southend Museums is home to the world's largest collection of Ekco material including radios, television sets, electric heaters and blankets, bathroom accessories, domestic design, kitchenware, and a large archive of documents and ephemera.

The Science Museum, London holds a collection of EKCO Electronics, Ekco Heating and Appliances, and Ekco Plastics, while the Museum of Design in Plastic has a collection of Ekco products. The Victoria and Albert Museum have 71 items from Ekco in their collection.
