= List of British Army radio sets =

A list of British Army radio equipment.

== Tactical systems ==
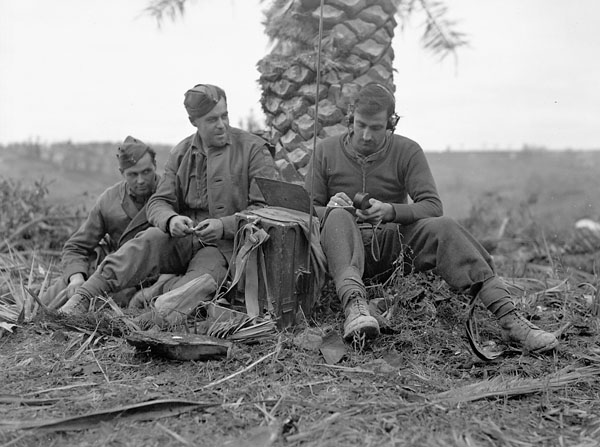
Infantrymen of The Loyal Edmonton Regiment operating a No. 18 wireless set outside Regimental Headquarters, Ortona, Italy, December 21, 1943

- W/T Set 120 Watt - Continuous Wave (CW) Wireless Teletype set introduced in 1918.
- W/T Set "A" - Continuous Wave (CW) Wireless Teletype set introduced in 1922.
- W/T Sets "C" - Continuous Wave (CW) Wireless Teletype set introduced in 1923.
- Wireless Set No. 1 – Short-range radio developed in 1933.
- Wireless Set No. 3
- Wireless Set No. 8 – Replaced by WS No. 18.
- Wireless Set No. 9
- Wireless Set No. 10 – Eight channel multiplexed microwave transmitter/receiver.
- Wireless Set No. 11 – Replacement for No. 1. Used by the likes of the Long Range Desert Group during WW2. Replaced by No. 19.
- Wireless Set No. 12 – Static or vehicle mounted transmitter station, range about 60 miles (~96 km).
- Wireless Set No. 17 – 2-valves, 44–61 MHz. Used by Searchlight Units.
- Wireless Set No. 18 – Manpack set, used for "short range telephony and C/W working in forward areas", about 5 miles (8 km) maximum, Bn HQ to Company HQ, 6–9 MHz
- Wireless Set No. 19 – Standard WW2 Tank set. Used in every theatre of operation. HF, 2–8 MHz, AM or Morse Code.
- Wireless Set No. 21 – Static or vehicle mounted transceiver 4.2 to 7.5 MHz.
- Wireless Set No. 22 – General-purpose low-power vehicle and ground station with facilities for man pack. Frequency range 2–8 MHz. MO control. RF output 1.5 W. R/T, CW. Range up to 20 miles (~ 32 kilometers). Used by airborne troops and anti-aircraft units.
- Wireless Set No. 31 – Manpack radio set. The US SCR-300 design adapted for British use.
- Wireless Set No. 33
- Wireless Set No. 37 – Short range lightweight transmitter/receiver for use by paratroops. Some components used in S-Phone.
- Wireless Set No. 38 – Manpack radio set, also produced as an AFV version for use in armoured vehicles to allow direct communication with infantry.
- Wireless Set No. 38 Mk. III – Late WWII infantry radio.
- Wireless Set No. 42 – Experimental general purpose vehicle/manpack HF set, tropicalised, 10W, 1.6–12.8 MHz. Project abandoned after field trials.
- Wireless Set No. 46 – Manpack radio set, used by beach landing troops, waterproof, 1W output AM or MCW.
- Wireless Set No. 48 – US-made version of WS18. Manpack HF AM or Morse Code.
- Wireless Set No. 52 – Canadian-made Remote Receiver.
- Wireless Set No. 58 – Canadian-made version of WS18.
- Wireless Set No. 62 – Short-range vehicle-mounted HF set, 1.6–10.0 MHz, CW & RT (AM).
- Wireless Set No. 68 – Similar to No. 18 set, lower frequency range.
- Wireless Set No. 76 – Transmitter set used in conjunction with receiver R109.
- Wireless Set No. 88 – VHF manpack set from 1947.
- Wireless Set No. 108
- Miniature Communications Receiver, Type 36/I
- Larkspur radio system
  - Station Radio A13 – HF manpack transceiver.
  - Station Radio A40 – Based on the Canadian C/PRC-26.
  - Station Radio A41 – British copy of the US AN/PRC-10. Replaced the WS No. 31 Set.
  - Station Radio A42 – British copy of the US AN/PRC-9.
  - Station Radio B44 – Short-range duplex AM set for artillery and anti-aircraft batteries.
  - Station Radio B45
  - Station Radio B47 – VHF transceiver, 38 to 56 MHz
  - Station Radio B48 – VHF transceiver, 26 to 38 MHz
  - Station Radio C12 – Interim HF AM/CW set designed by Pye.
  - Station Radio C13 – AM, NB-PhM & CW. Forward area HF set used where VHF was not appropriate.
  - Station Radio C42 – VHF transceiver, 36 to 60 MHz, for mobile communication in the forward battle area.
  - Station Radio C45 – VHF transceiver, 23 to 38 MHz.
- Clansman
- Bowman (communications system)
- Personal Role Radio
- High-capacity data radio

== See also ==
- Army Communications and Information Systems (United Kingdom)
- Paraset – WW2 morse code transceiver radio system
- List of radios – List of specific models of radios
