= Military Wireless Museum in the Midlands =

Museum in Kidderminster, Worcestershire, England

Coordinates: 52°23′9″N 2°14′48″W

The Military Wireless Museum is a private museum operated from Kidderminster, Worcestershire which displays a collection of military Wireless equipment from around the world. It developed from the private collection of Ben Nock and marks the importance of Wireless communications in the UK and around the globe during World War II and later years.

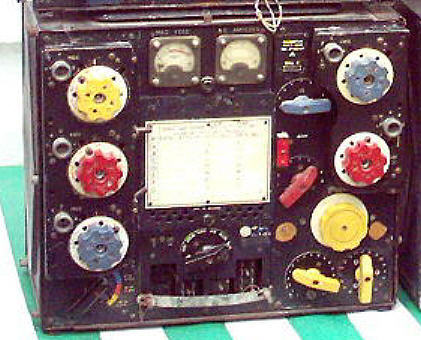
T1154 Transmitter

== Museum ==
The Military Wireless Museum collection is located at Kidderminster and is run on an entirely voluntary basis. The museum has a 'Friends of the museum' section, open to anyone, with members from all over the world. The museum often puts on displays of radio equipment at various events around the UK and abroad. The museum can also give talks to interested groups.

The museum demonstrates the importance of wireless communications and connected services like Radar and Navigation and the role they plated during World War II and other conflicts. The museum also offers interested parties the chance to see military communication equipment from other countries that might not normally be available. The museum has a large collection of radio equipment relating to Spy and Espionage work.

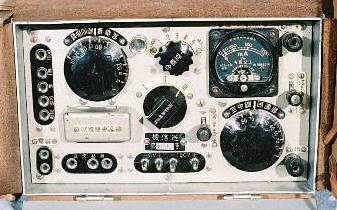
Japanese Type 94 Mark 5 Radio Transmitter

The Amateur Radio call sign GB0MWM is frequently in use at the museum operating the vintage equipment and demonstrating it to visitors. The museum is happy to send all UK and worldwide contacts a QSL card which are subsequently exchanged with the stations contacted.

== Exhibits ==
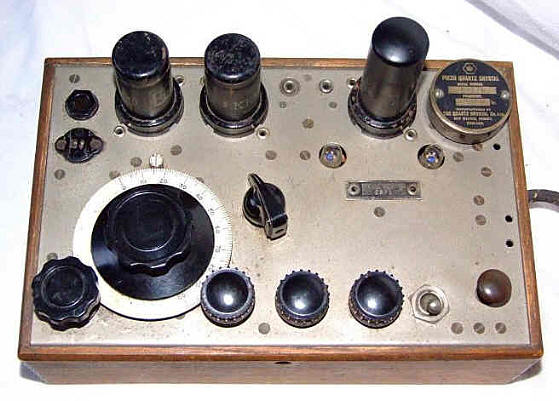
Paraset Spy Radio Set

The museum has an extensive collection of British, American, Japanese, German, French and other countries wartime communications equipment along with equipment from later periods. The museum also houses many handbooks and technical information of the equipment along with a growing collection of uniforms and associated military equipment.

Examples of exhibits displayed:

- British Wireless sets No.18, No.19, No.22, No.62
- Japanese World War II receivers and transmitters.
- German Bomber radios
- USA war time sets.
- spy Suitcase Radios from Britain, USA, Germany and Italy.
- wireless receivers made in the UK by companies such as EKCO.

== Museum history ==
Ben Nock has been a Radio Amateur since the late 1960s and started in the hobby, as many did in those days, using surplus radio equipment from the second world war. After years of simply playing with the hobby there came a turning point in the 1980s when the thought of collecting this equipment for future preservation occurred and the process of collecting was begun.

After 20 years the collection has grown to around 900 sets and countless additional items of military hardware . The Virtual Museum web site was conceived in the late 1990s and the site is expanded daily. The museum continues to grow at around 2 to 3 sets a month.

In 2011 the museum moved to a new site in Kidderminster more suitable for a physical display and where the equipment and artifacts have been be laid out for better presentation and for greater accessibility by the public and those interested in the subject. Ben Nock continues to write articles on the subject of Military Wireless with many appearing in the Practical Wireless magazine and Radio Bygones magazine while others have been published in the American CQ magazine and even the RAFA magazine.

The museum is always pleased to give talks and displays to clubs or groups or events relating to the field of militaria or communications.

== See also ==
- List of World War II electronic warfare equipment
- Radar in World War II
- Marine radar
- Luftwaffe radio equipment of World War II
