= Special event station =

Amateur radio station type

In amateur radio, a Special Event Station is a special operation usually in commemoration of a special or historical event, often with a special vanity call sign. These stations generally operate for a short time and have special QSL cards to commemorate the event.

Special event stations licensed in the United States will often have a special 1x1 call sign.

== Examples ==
The National World War One Museum, at the Liberty Memorial, in Kansas City, Missouri, for instance will be having a special event station over the next six years in observance of the centennial of the Great War, under the call sign WW1USA.

The Military Wireless Museum in the Midlands special event callsign is GB0MWM and can be heard on most bands. It can be operated by visitors to the museum who hold a ham radio license. Also, the USS South Dakota Wireless Association "N0EBC" activates the museum and memorial to the ship and crew members of the WW2 battleship USS South Dakota BB57 located in Sioux falls, South Dakota each Veterans Day, November 11. often under the 1x1 call "W0V"
