= Charles Orr Stanley =

Charles Orr Stanley CBE (15 April 1899 – 18 January 1989) was a businessman who played an important role in the early development of commercial radio and television in Great Britain, especially in his role as head of Pye Ltd. Pye produced receivers for use in Chain Home, the British coastal defence radar system, and helped with the supply of EF50 valves for later British radar operating at VHF.
