= Wireless Set No. 1 =

British communications radio

Wireless Set Number 1, or WS No. 1 for short, was a short-range tactical radio introduced by the British Army in 1933. It was built in three versions, 1A for fixed locations like field headquarters, 1B for light vehicles, and 1C for tanks. Several hundred were also produced in Canada by Canadian Marconi and Northern Electric.

It had a number of limitations in terms of limited frequency selections and a relatively short range on the order of 5 miles (8.0 km). A new set was ordered in 1938 as the Wireless Set No. 11, which rapidly replaced the small numbers of No. 1 sets in service. The No. 11 was in turn replaced by the much more capable Wireless Set No. 19 in the mid-war period.
