= MEL Equipment =

Defunct british manufacturer of radio and avionics equipment

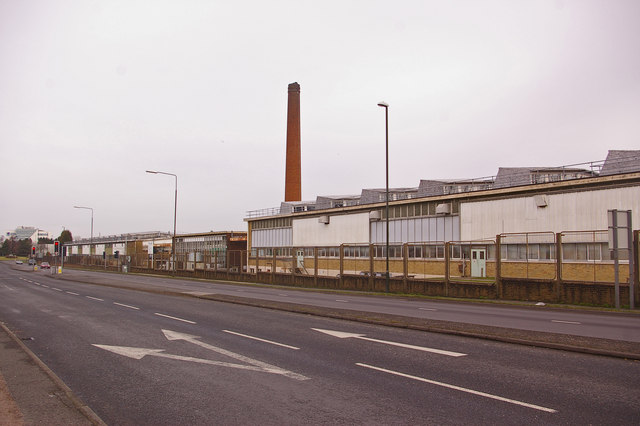
Former MEL Equipment site in Crawley

MEL Equipment was a British manufacturer of radar, avionics and military radio equipment based in West Sussex.

== History ==
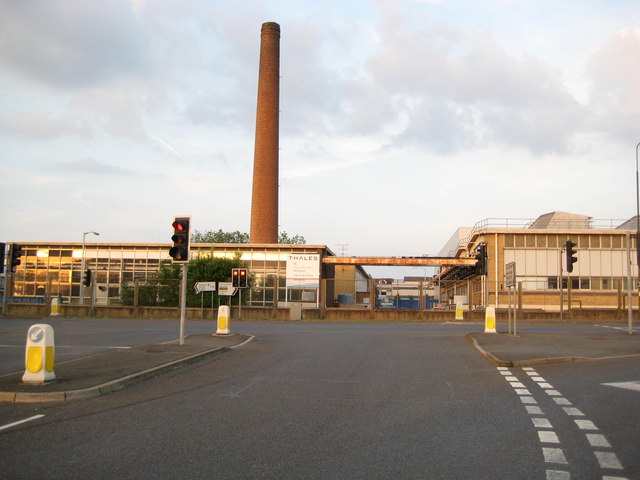
Former site on Manor Royal in Crawley, now owned by Thales

The company was formed as Radio Transmission Equipment in March 1935 with premises in Nightingale Lane, Balham, south London. In 1947 it was renamed Mullard Equipment Ltd (often abbreviated to MEL). and later MEL Equipment Company Ltd. It moved to Crawley in 1961. In the 1970s, the company was employing around 2,250.

== Products ==
- Larkspur radio equipment
- Clansman radio equipment
- EKCO E390/564 airborne weather radar (for Concorde)
- Microwave Airborne Digital Guidance Equipment
- Precision approach radar
- Radar transponders

=== Products currently made by the Thales site ===
- Cerberus Mission System for Royal Navy helicopters
- Searchwater radar

== See also ==
- Hensoldt
- Thales Training & Simulation
- Mullard
