= Pye (electronics company) =

English electronics company

W. G. Pye & Co. Ltd
- Industry: Electronics
- Founded: Cambridge, 1896
- Defunct: 1988
- Fate: Discontinued
- Headquarters: York Street, Cambridge
- Products: Televisions; Radios; Telecommunications equipment
- Parent: Philips

Pye Ltd was an electronics company founded in 1896 in Cambridge, England, as a manufacturer of scientific instruments. The company merged with EKCO in 1960. Philips of the Netherlands acquired a majority shareholding in 1967, and later gained full ownership.

== Early growth ==
W. G. Pye & Co. Ltd was founded in 1896 in Cambridge by William Pye, superintendent of the Cavendish Laboratory workshop, as a part-time business making scientific instruments. By the outbreak of World War I in 1914, the company employed 40 people manufacturing instruments used for teaching and research. The war increased demand for such instruments and the War Office needed experimental thermionic valves. The manufacture of such components afforded the company the technical knowledge needed to develop the first wireless receiver when the first UK broadcasts were made by the British Broadcasting Company in 1922. Instruments continued to be designed and manufactured under W G Pye Ltd, later situated in York Street Cambridge, while a separate company was started to build wireless components in a factory to become known as Cambridge Works at Church Path, Chesterton.

A series of receivers made at Church Path were given positive reviews by Popular Wireless magazine. In 1924, Harold Pye, the son of the founder, and Edward Appleton, his former tutor at St John's College, Cambridge, designed a new series of receivers which proved even more saleable. In 1928 William Pye sold the company, now renamed Pye Radio Limited, to C. O. Stanley, who established a chain of small component-manufacturing factories across East Anglia.

When the BBC started to explore television broadcasting, Pye found that the closest of their East Anglian offices was 25 miles outside the estimated effective 25-mile radius of the Alexandra Palace transmitter. Stanley was fascinated by the new technology and on his instructions the company built a high gain receiver that could pick up these transmissions. In 1937, a five-inch Pye television receiver was priced at 21 guineas (£22.05) and within two years the company had sold 2,000 sets at an average price of £34 (equivalent to £1,921 in 2025).

The new EF50 valve from Philips enabled Pye to build this high-gain receiver, which was a tuned radio frequency (TRF) type and not a superhet type. With the outbreak of World War II, the Pye receiver using EF50 valves became a key component of many radar receivers, forming the 45 MHz Intermediate Amplifier (IF) section of the equipment. Pye went on to design and manufacture radio equipment for the British Army, including Wireless Sets No. 10, 18, 19, 22, 62 and 68. Pye was also responsible for the early development work on the proximity fuze for anti-aircraft shells.

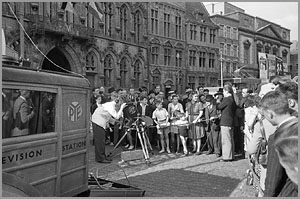
Demo of television in Mons (Belgium) on 16 September 1947

In February 1944, Pye formed a subsidiary called Pye Telecommunications Ltd, which it intended would design and produce radio communications equipment when the war ended. This company grew to become the leading UK producer of mobile radio equipment for commercial, business, industrial, police and government purposes. Popular products included the Reporter, Cambridge, and Westminster series of VHF radio transceivers. The company also produced the PF8 UHF hand-held radios featured in episodes of The Professionals television series.

After the war, Pye's B16T nine-inch table television was designed around the 12-year-old EF50 valve. It was soon superseded by the B18T, which used an extra high tension (EHT) transformer developed by German companies before the war to produce the high voltage required by the cathode-ray tube.

In 1955, the company diversified into music production with Pye Records. The Independent Television Authority (ITA) started public transmissions in the same year, so Pye produced new televisions that could receive ITV, and the availability of a second channel introduced the need for tuners. Pye's VT4 tunable television was launched in March 1954 and was followed by the V14. The V14 proved to be technically unreliable and so tarnished the Pye name that many dealers transferred their allegiance to other manufacturers. This failure so damaged corporate confidence that Pye avoided being first-to-market thereafter, although they developed the first British transistor in 1956.

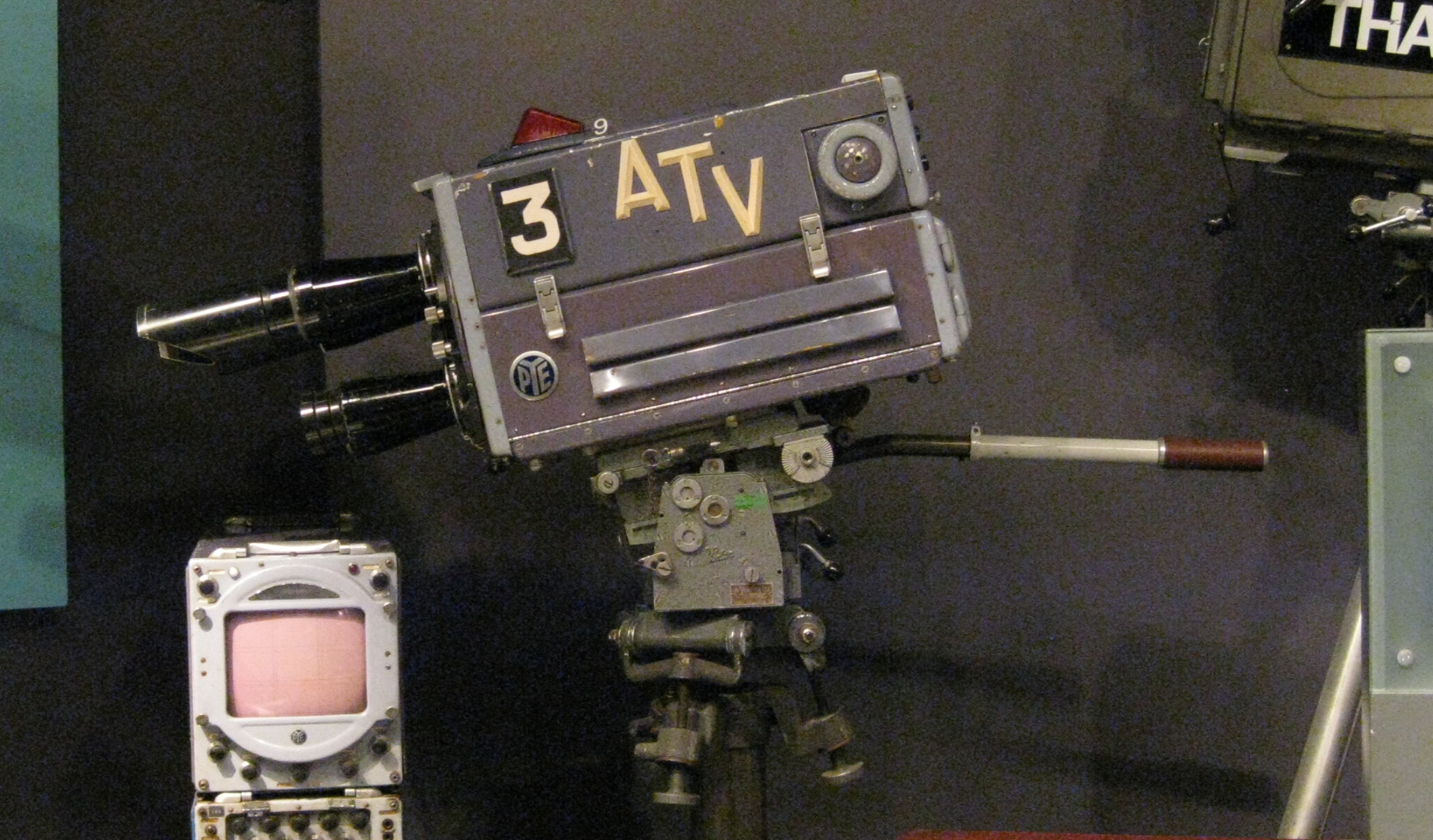
Pye television camera and monitor

Pye TVT Ltd was formed to produce broadcast television equipment, including cameras, which were popular with British broadcasters including the BBC as well as achieving international sales. The early cameras were called "Photicon" and the later models by their Mk number: 2, 3, etc. The Mk7/8 solid-state monochrome cameras were the last to be produced. The Pye Mk6 image orthicon camera, known as the PC60, was the last version supplied to BBC Outside Broadcasts in 1963 for a new fleet of eight outside broadcast vans. These cameras were the first generation of outside broadcast cameras to feature a zoom lens, rather than a turret system. These three-tubed cameras were known for their reliability but were so heavy and unwieldy that they required a stretcher to carry them around the OB site. The Pye PC60 was eventually replaced by the EMI 2001 on BBC outside broadcasts but, during its lifespan, it was used on numerous high-profile productions including Wimbledon tennis and Open golf.

The ITV companies purchased the Pye Mk3s, and to a lesser extent the Mk4s and Mk7s. Pye TVT never produced a colour broadcast television camera, but there was an abortive colour telecine camera; few if any were sold. The reason for this was probably the financial difficulties the company was in.

In 1960, Pye acquired the Telephone Manufacturing Company.

== Decline and sale ==
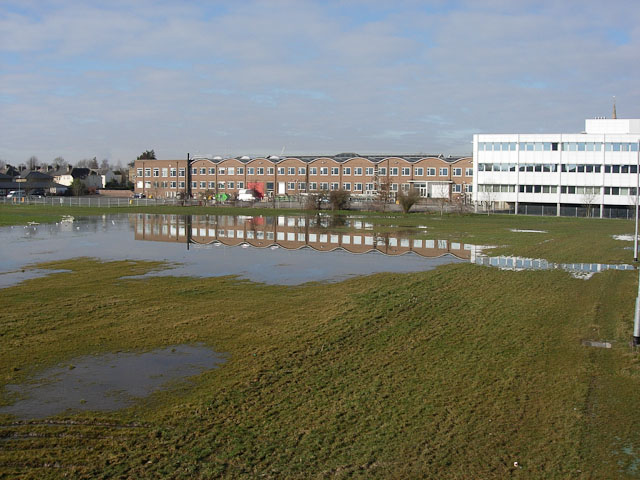
"D" building at the former Chesterton Pye factory site, viewed from Logan's Meadow

Not wishing to risk further damage to their fragile brand, Pye first used transistors in a product sold as a subsidiary brand: the Pam 710 radio (1956), with the transistors themselves labelled Newmarket Transistors (another subsidiary). When this proved acceptable the company launched the Pye 123 radio (1957, still with the Newmarket label on the novel internal components). Products such as these reversed the decline but the arrival of Japanese competition reduced demand to a level that threatened the viability of the manufacturing plants. In 1960, Pye merged with its rival EKCO to form British Electronic Industries Ltd, with C. O. Stanley as chairman and E. K. Cole as vice-chairman.

The company, like most of its domestic competitors, attempted to restore demand with price competition and, where viable production exceeded demand, sold excess stock at loss-making clearance prices. By 1966 Pye was in such difficulties that they started to reduce their manufacturing capacity with closure of the EKCO factory in Southend-on-Sea.

Philips attempted to buy out the ailing Pye in 1966. The Minister of Technology Tony Benn determined that a complete sale would create a de facto monopoly so he permitted the transfer of only a 60% shareholding, with an undertaking that the Lowestoft factory would continue to manufacture televisions.

On 20 April 1964, BBC2 was launched, broadcasting entirely on the new television standard of 625-line UHF, but BBC1 and ITV would remain in 405-line VHF until 1969, when they began UHF broadcasting. During this transition, television receivers in the UK had to handle both the VHF and UHF wavebands, which added to the cost of producing the sets. The price of a dual-standard set, combined with the limited coverage of BBC2, meant that initial sales of dual-standard sets were slow.

PAL colour test signals began in 1966 and scheduled transmissions commenced on BBC2 on 1 July 1967, with a full colour service beginning on that channel on 2 December 1967. BBC1 and ITV followed suit on 15 November 1969. Colour broadcasting added further to the cost and complexity of producing television sets. The resulting high price and low coverage areas of the new technology delayed consumer adoption further: it wasn't until 1977 that the number of colour licences sold outnumbered those of black and white.

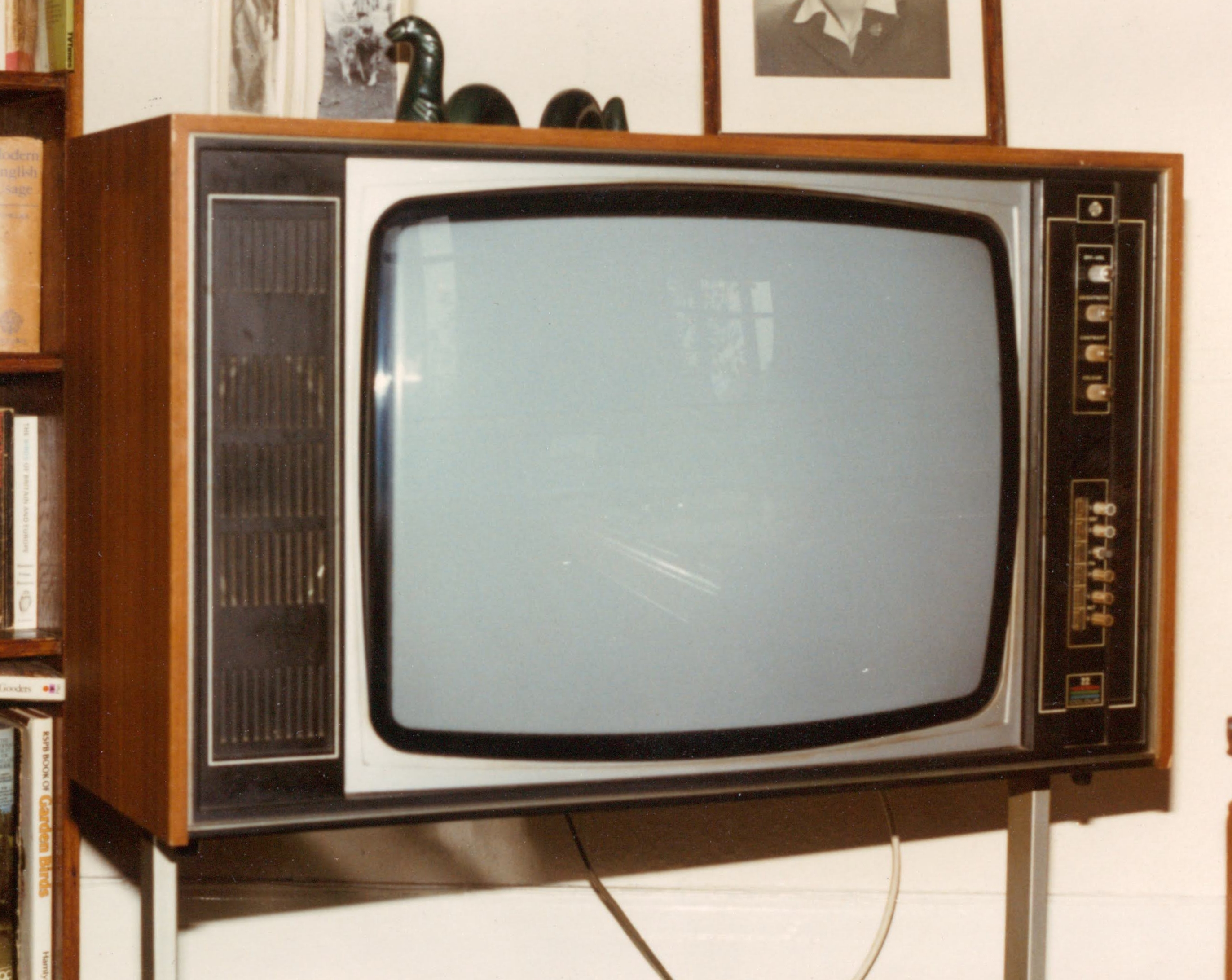
Pye CT205 colour television

In the early 1970s, Sony and Hitachi launched UK colour televisions that cost less than £200. Domestic manufacturers attempted to compete, but were handicapped by outdated manufacturing techniques and an inflexible workforce. Pye found themselves with high stocks and low cash flow at a time of poor industrial relations, a low-growth economy and limited scope for reducing costs. The Pye group of companies was bought outright by Philips in 1976. The Lowestoft factory was subsequently sold to Sanyo and Philips moved the manufacture of Pye televisions to Singapore.

Prior to the manufacturing offshoring, the company produced a range of televisions branded 'Pye Chelsea'. The range were teak-clad with stainless steel 'feet'. The Chelsea range were popular with TV rental companies such as Radio Rentals, Rumbelows and Wigfalls. Maintenance of these sets continued well into the 1980s, with the northern rental chain Wigfalls being the last to withdraw them in 1988.

In 1979 Pye were implicated in an episode of Granada's World in Action in relation to the sale of UHF and VHF radios as well as telephone intercept equipment which was used by the Ugandan Public Safety Unit, the secret police of Idi Amin's rule responsible for killing perhaps several hundred thousand Ugandans. Pye had been supplying Uganda through Wilken Telecommunications, its East Africa distributor.

The Pye brand enjoyed a short-lived renaissance in audio equipment (known as music centres) during the 1970s, and in the late 1980s with televisions and Video 2000 video recorders. The brand later appeared on DVD recorders.

Since 2021, the Pye brand and symbol has been owned by manufacturer Alice Ltd.
