= Joan-Eleanor system =

World War II-era VHF radio system

The Joan-Eleanor system (or J-E for short) was a clandestine very high frequency (VHF) radio system developed by the United States OSS during World War II for use by espionage agents working behind enemy lines to relay information and replaced the earlier S-Phone system developed by the SOE.

== Design and development ==
The Joan-Eleanor system was developed from late 1942 onwards for the US Office of Strategic Services (OSS) by DeWitt R. Goddard and Lt. Cmdr. Stephen H. Simpson, with some contributions from mobile radio pioneer Alfred J. Gross. It is said to have been named for Goddard's wife Eleanor, and a WAC Major of Simpson's acquaintance named Joan Marshall.

The initial design work was performed at RCA's laboratories in Riverhead, New York, and the production units produced by Citizens Radio of Cleveland, Freed Radio Corporation of New York City, Dictagraph Corporation of New York, and the Signal-U Manufacturing Company. Most of the testing was carried out in the United States and some at Bovington, England, beginning in July 1944, to refine the equipment. The first operational use occurred later that year.

The system was classified as top secret by the US military and was not declassified until 1976.

== Description ==
The system comprised a pair of transceivers:

- A handheld SSTC-502 transmitter ("Joan") for use by an agent in the field.
- An SSTR-6 receiver ("Eleanor") carried on an aircraft flying overhead at a prearranged time.

The system was designed to use the VHF band, since it was known that these frequencies could not be effectively monitored by the enemy. The agent made his report in plain speech, and the aircraft recorded the transmission on a wire recorder. Since Morse code was not required, the agent did not need to be trained in it, thus reducing overall training time, which was considered an advantage in the European theater. Additionally, the aircraft could ask for immediate clarification if required, without the delay of encryption and decryption, or an intelligence officer aboard the circling aircraft could talk directly with the agent.

Because of the low power and the unit's limited range, the transmissions were virtually undetectable and the Germans were unaware of the system.

=== SSTC-502 transceiver ===
Unlike large conventional radios that weighed up to 30 pounds (14 kg), the hand-held SSTC-502 transceiver was only 6.5 inches (17 cm) long and weighed less than 1 pound (0.45 kg). It used a dual triode as a combination super-regenerative detector while receiving, and an oscillator during transmission. Two other vacuum tubes acted as a microphone amplifier and modulator. The antenna was a simple dipole attached to the top of the unit and the only controls were for regeneration and fine tuning. The unit was powered by two D cell batteries for the tube filaments, and two 67.5 volt batteries for the tubes' plates. The original operating frequency was 250 MHz, but when it was discovered that the Germans had a receiver capable of operating at this frequency, it was changed to 260 MHz.

=== SSTR-6 transceiver ===
The airborne SSTR-6 transceiver weighed about 40 pounds (18 kg). It had a superheterodyne receiver with two RF amplifier stages, two limiter stages, and an FM detector. Power was supplied by four 6 volt wet cell batteries. The equipment was used in B-17 and de Havilland Mosquito aircraft, the Mosquito being used for most missions due to its high speed and high altitude capability which rendered it safe from most defenses.

== Operational ==
The initial aircraft used with the J-E system were de Havilland Mosquito PR (Photoreconnaissance) Mk. XVI aircraft of the 654th Bombardment Squadron, 25th Bomb Group Rcn at RAF Watton. Since 25th Bomb Group personnel flew Joan-Eleanor missions for OSS, Watton wished credit for these in monthly operational tabulations. They assigned the label Redstocking to the missions. For J-E missions the rear-fuselage compartment, aft of the bomb-bay, was fitted with an oxygen system and modified to accept the SSTR-6 transceiver and wire recorder, with an operator sitting on a cramped seat, and accessed through a side hatch.

The first successful operational use of the system was made on 22 November 1944 by Stephen H. Simpson; he recorded transmissions from an agent codenamed "Bobbie" while circling at 30,000 feet (9,100 m) over the occupied Netherlands. Another occurred on 12–13 March 1945 when a Mosquito PR XVI at 25,500 feet (7,800 m) near Berlin established radio contact with agents who had been dropped on 1–2 March from an A-26 Invader.

On 13 March 1945, HQ 8th AF ordered the OSS J-E Project transferred to the 492nd Bomb Group's Liberator base at RAF Harrington, Northamptonshire. The 492nd continued using Redstocking to identify the Mosquito missions. On 14 March two Mosquitoes and an A-26 flew to Harrington followed on the 15th by other Mosquitoes and A-26s. The 25th BG aircrew flew the OSS Mosquito JE missions until 492nd men completed training on this aircraft type. Both Mosquito and A-26 remained stationed at Harrington, and on occasion a Mosquito flew to Watton for inspection. OSS J-E project personnel at RAF Harrington questioned the competency of 492nd BG maintaining the Mosquito and J-E operations, and frequently consulted RAF Watton. Aborts excluded, the 654th Bombardment Squadron flew 30 Joan-Eleanor Mosquito missions from RAF Watton on behalf of the OSS over the Netherlands and Germany, and an additional 21 J-E Mosquito missions from RAF Harrington. 492nd flew 10 J-E Mosquito missions.
