= William George Pye =

- Born: 27 October 1869; Battersea, London
- Died: 13 October 1949 (aged 79); Bexhill-on-sea, Sussex, United Kingdom
- Known for: Founding Pye Ltd

William George Pye (27 October 1869 – 13 October 1949) was a British engineer and businessman who founded W. G. Pye, a company which manufactured scientific and optical equipment.

The firm, founded in 1896, prospered during World War I by manufacturing specialist equipment such as gun sights and the Aldis signalling lamp. After the war, new products had to be found and the company started to manufacture radio parts such as thermionic valves and later a radio.

Harold John Pye, William's son, joined the firm and helped to develop an improved radio which proved so successful that the radio manufacturing side of W. G. Pye and the rights to the name Pye Radio were sold. William and Harold continued to operate W. G. Pye, making optical equipment. World War II again brought an increase of business. In 1947, Pye Radio approached Harold with a substantial offer that would reunite the radio and optical divisions.

William died at Bexhill, Sussex on 13 October 1949.
