= Harold John Pye =

Harold John Pye (27 November 1901 – 20 January 1986) was the son of William George Pye who, in 1896, started a company called W G Pye which manufactured scientific and optical equipment. The firm prospered during the Second World War by manufacturing specialist equipment such as gun sights. After the war, new products needed to be found and the company started to manufacture radio parts and eventually a radio. Harold joined the firm and helped to develop a new radio which proved so successful that the radio manufacturing side of W G Pye and the rights to the name Pye Radio were bought. William and Harold continued to operate W G Pye making optical equipment.

In 1949, Pye Radio approached Harold with a substantial offer that would reunite the radio and optical divisions. The offer was accepted and Harold retired to become a farmer at Burnham on Crouch in Essex.

He died at Ipswich, Suffolk, on 20 January 1986.
