= S-Phone =

WW2 radio system

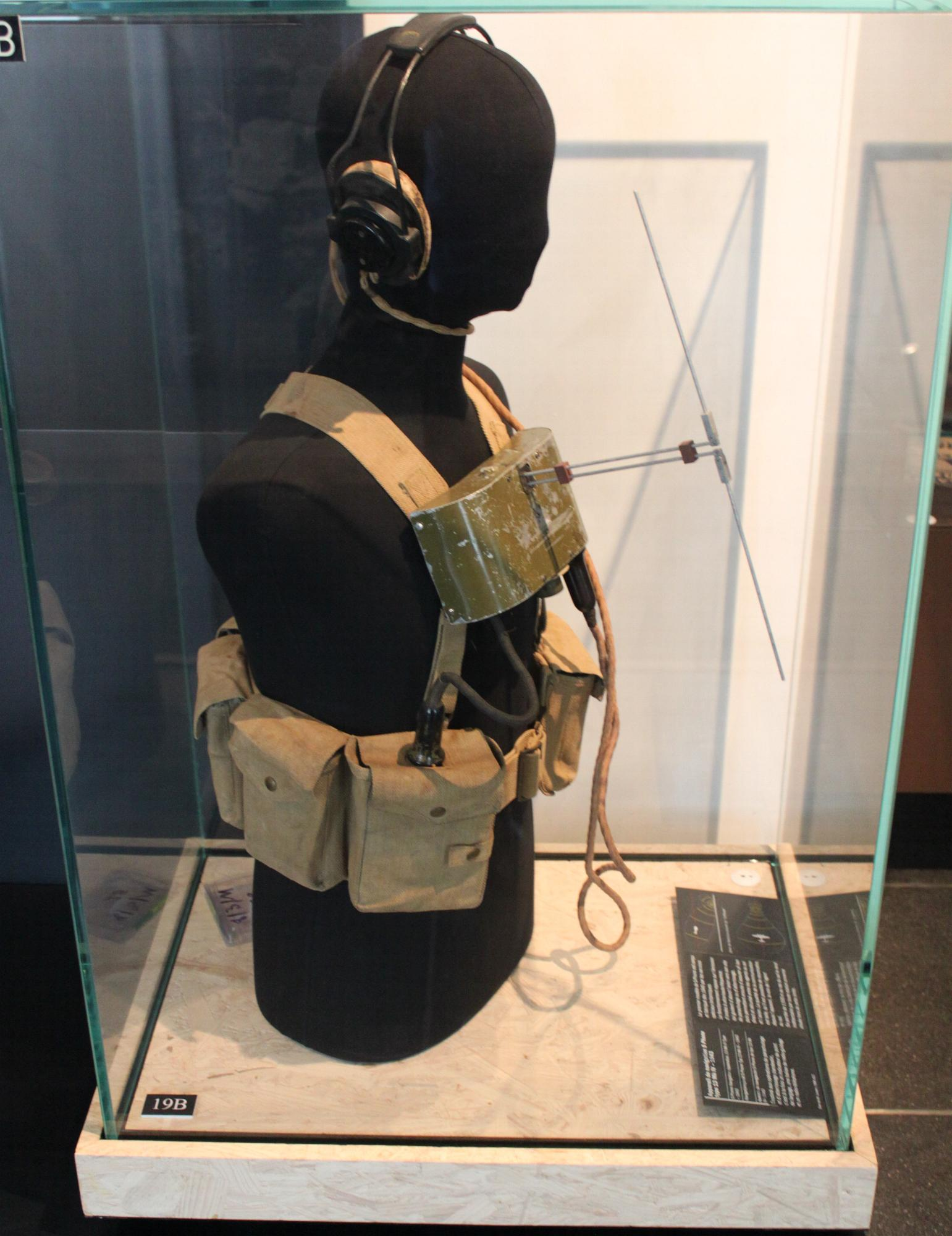
S-phone MK-IV, 1943

The S-Phone system was a UHF duplex radiotelephone system developed during World War II for use by Special Operations Executive agents working behind enemy lines to communicate with friendly aircraft and coordinate landings and the dropping of agents and supplies. The system was composed of a "Ground" transceiver, designed by Captain Bert Lane, and an "Air" transceiver designed by Major Hobday, both of the Royal Signals.

== Description ==
The "Ground" set - which was to be used by agents on the ground - weighed about 15 pounds (6.8 kg) including batteries and was typically worn attached to its operator with two canvas straps. It was a highly directional unit which required the operator to face the path of the aircraft. It had the useful trait that transmitted signals could not be picked up by ground monitoring stations more than one mile distant; however, its signal was only good to 10,000 feet (3,000 m), which brought the aircraft within range of flak. It permitted direct two-way voice communication with an aircraft up to a range of 30 miles (48 km). While the S-Phone provided directional information to the pilot it gave no range information, although a pilot could tell when he was directly over the "Ground" operator because at that point no communication was possible.

The primary purpose of the S-Phone was not navigational as such; rather, it was to provide a reasonably secure channel for coded conversation between staff officers based in London and agents in the field, allowing for the exchange of orders and information. The security of a circuit was sometimes tested by using an officer who could recognize whether a voice was actually that of the agent who was supposedly speaking.

It was designed in late 1942, using some of the component parts of the Wireless Set No.37.

Use of the phone is shown in the post-war docu-drama Now It Can Be Told (aka School for Danger, 1946) on YouTube.

== See also ==
- List of British Army radio sets
- Joan-Eleanor a similar system developed for the OSS
- Paraset

== Specifications ==
=== General ===
- Frequency: 337 MHz (TX) / 380 MHz (RX)
- Output Power: 0.1 to 0.2 W
