= Al Gross (engineer) =

American inventor (1918–2000)

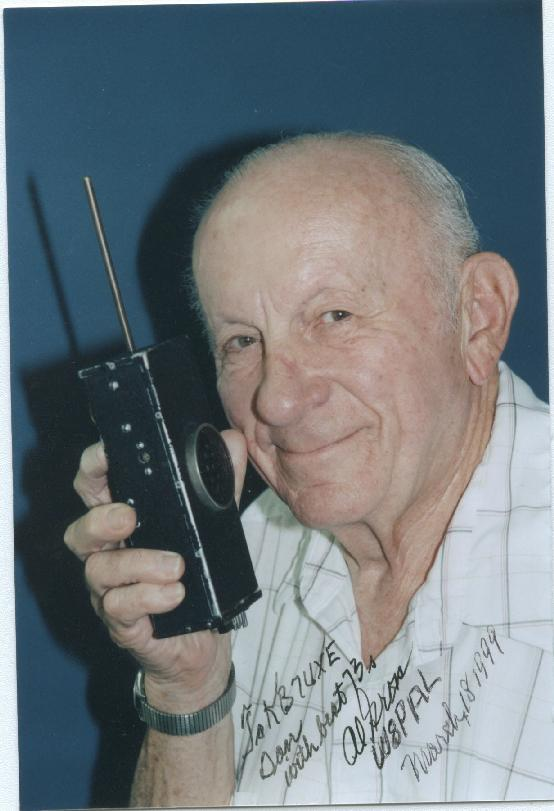
- Gross in 1999
- Born: February 22, 1918; Toronto, Ontario, Canada
- Died: December 21, 2000 (aged 82); Sun City, Arizona, U.S.
- Engineering career
- Discipline: Wireless communication

Irving "Al" Gross (/ɡroʊs/; February 22, 1918 – December 21, 2000) was a pioneer in mobile wireless communication. He created and patented many communications devices, specifically in relation to an early version of the walkie-talkie, Citizens' Band radio, the telephone pager and the cordless telephone.

== Life and career ==
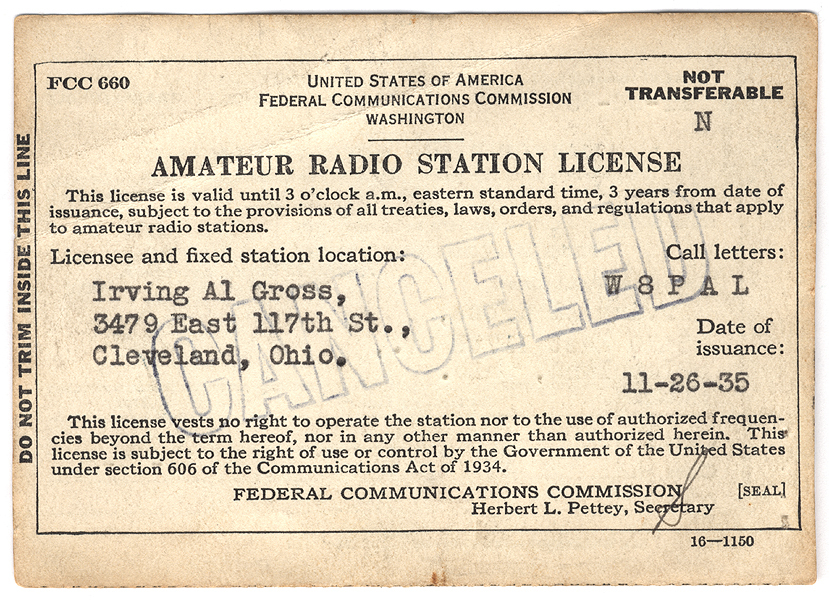
FCC amateur radio license of Al Gross

Gross was born in Toronto, Ontario, Canada in 1918, the son of Romanian-Jewish immigrants, he grew up in Cleveland, Ohio, in the United States.

His lifelong enthusiasm for radio was sparked at age nine, when traveling on Lake Erie by a steamboat. While sneaking around the boat he ended up in the radio transmissions room. The ship's operator let him listen in on transmissions. Later, Gross turned the basement of his house into a radio station, built from scavenged junkyard parts.

At sixteen he earned his amateur radio license, and he used his call sign (W8PAL) his whole life.

=== The walkie-talkie ===
His interest and knowledge in radio technology had grown considerably by the time he in 1936 entered the BSEE program at Cleveland's Case of Applied Sciences (now a part of Case Western Reserve University). He was determined to investigate the unexplored frequency region above 100 MHz. Between 1938 and 1941, soon after the invention of the "walkie-talkie" in 1937 by Donald Hings, he created and patented his own version of it.

=== World War II ===
During World War II, Gross had some limited involvement in building a two-way VHF air-to-ground communications system for the U.S. Office of Strategic Services for use in military operations, known as the Joan-Eleanor system. It comprised a hand-held SSTC-502 transceiver ("Joan") and a much larger aircraft-based SSTR-6 transceiver ("Eleanor"). Gross' actual contribution to the project is unclear (he was not an OSS member), but the main developers on the project were Dewitt R. Goddard and Lt. Cmdr. Stephen H. Simpson (Goddard's wife's name was Eleanor, and reportedly Joan was an acquaintance of Simpson).

The system operated at frequencies above 250 MHz, which was at a much higher frequency than the enemy had thought conceivable. This allowed operatives using "Joan" to communicate with high altitude bombers carrying "Eleanor" for times of 10 to 15 minutes without the use of code words, eliminating the need for decryption. It was developed beginning in late 1942, was highly successful and very difficult to detect behind enemy lines at the time. It was marked Top Secret by the U.S. military until it was declassified and made public in 1976.

=== Citizens' Band (CB) ===
After the war the FCC allocated the first frequencies for personal radio services; the Citizens' Radio Service Frequency Band (1946). Gross formed Gross Electronics Co. to produce two-way communications system to utilize these frequencies, and his company was the first to receive FCC approval in 1948. He sold more than 100 thousand units of his system, mostly to farmers and the U.S. Coast Guard.

=== Two-way radios ===
Cartoonist Chester Gould asked if he could use Gross' concept of a miniaturized two-way radio in his Dick Tracy comic strip. The result was the Dick Tracy two-way wrist radio.

=== Telephone pager ===
Another breakthrough came in 1949 when he adapted his two-way radios to one-way for cordless remote telephonic signaling. He had effectively invented the first telephone pager system. His intention for this system was to be used by medical doctors, but was met with skepticism by doctors who were afraid the system would upset patients. This same technology is used in one-way radio signaling devices such as garage door openers.

=== Later years ===
In 1950 he tried in vain to interest telephone companies in mobile telephony. Bell Telephone was uninterested, and other companies were afraid of Bell's monopoly on transmission lines.

Gross continued inventing, and began working as a specialist in microwave and other communications systems for companies such as Sperry Corporation and General Electric. He continued working until his death at age 82.

== Recognition ==
Gross has received much recognition for his work, including, but not limited to:

=== Awards ===
- 1984: IEEE Centennial Medal from the Institute of Electrical and Electronics Engineers, for his work in VHF and UHF mobile radio.
- 1992: Fred M. Link Award from the Radio Club of America
- 1997: Marconi Memorial Gold Medal of Achievement from the Veteran Wireless Operators Association
- 1998: Eta Kappa Nu's Vladimir Karapetoff Eminent Members' Award
- 1999: Edwin Howard Armstrong Achievement Award from the IEEE Communications Society
- 2000: IEEE Millennium Medal

=== Honors ===
- 2000: Lemelson-MIT Lifetime Achievement Award for Invention and Innovation

== See also ==
- Wireless communication
- Radio
