= Wireless Set Number 11 =

British Army radio set

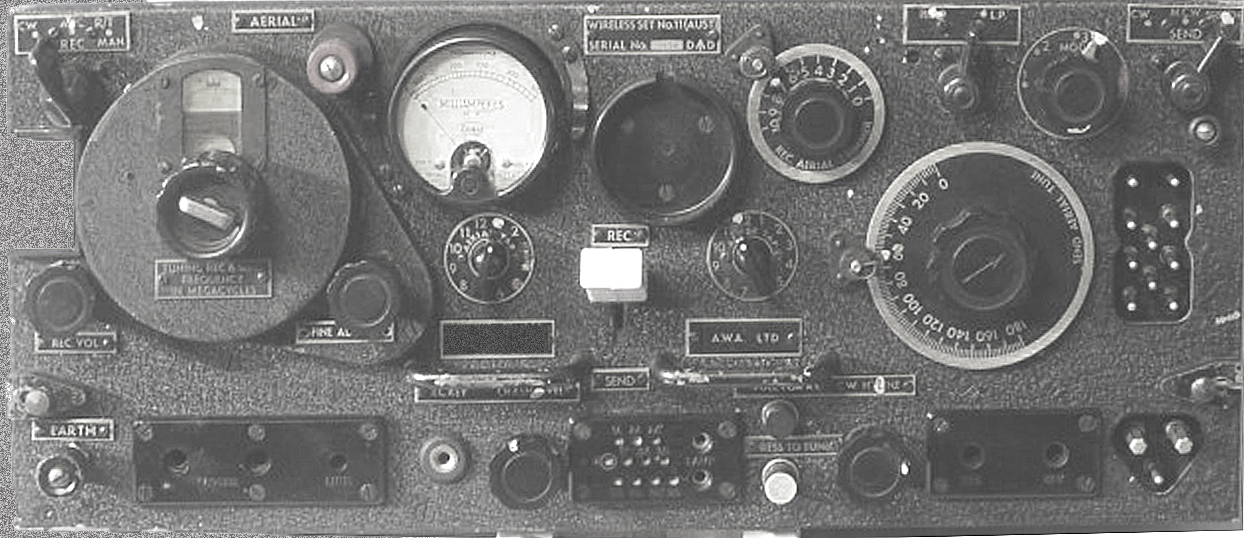
Wireless set No. 11

The Wireless Set Number 11, or WS No. 11, was a radio set designed for the British Army in 1938. It was designed to replace the 1933 Wireless Set No. 1 which had been found inadequate for a number of reasons. Like the No. 1, it was designed to be used in fixed locations like regimental field headquarters, as well as in vehicles and tanks.

Some No. 11s were produced between 1938 and 1940 before they, too, were considered inadequate. A smaller production run in Canada was also completed by Canadian Marconi and used both by Canadian and British forces. The No. 11 was replaced in tanks by the significantly more capable Wireless Set No. 19, while the No. 11 went on to be used by many others, notably the Long Range Desert Group.

== History ==
The No. 11 set, a radio transceiver featuring a single tuning unit, was designed in 1938 to replace the 1933 Wireless Set No. 1. Originally designed to be used in tanks for short- and medium-range communications, it was later used by the Long Range Desert Group in Libya and Tunisia for long-range communications while deep behind enemy lines. The Germans reportedly captured several sets in France and put them to use for their own communication needs. The set was also manufactured in Australia by AWA with different valves and alterations to its circuitry.

== Specifications ==
- Power: Batteries or 6 V or 12 V mains supply
- RF output: 0.6 W to 4.5 W
- Communication range: Approximately 3 to 20 miles (5 to 32 km) using 6-foot (1.8 m) or 9-foot (2.7 m) aerials.
- Dimensions: 8.5 by 19.5 by 12 inches (22 cm × 50 cm × 30 cm)
- Weight: 43 pounds (20 kg); complete low and high power stations weigh 180 pounds (82 kg) and 216 pounds (98 kg).
- Control: Direct or remote, enabling operation at 400 m (440 yd) and a remote aerial at up to 10 m (11 yd)
- Frequency range: 4.5 to 7.1 MHz

== See also ==
- BC-348
- SCR-284
- Wireless Set No. 19
- Vintage amateur radio
