= Clansman (military radio) =

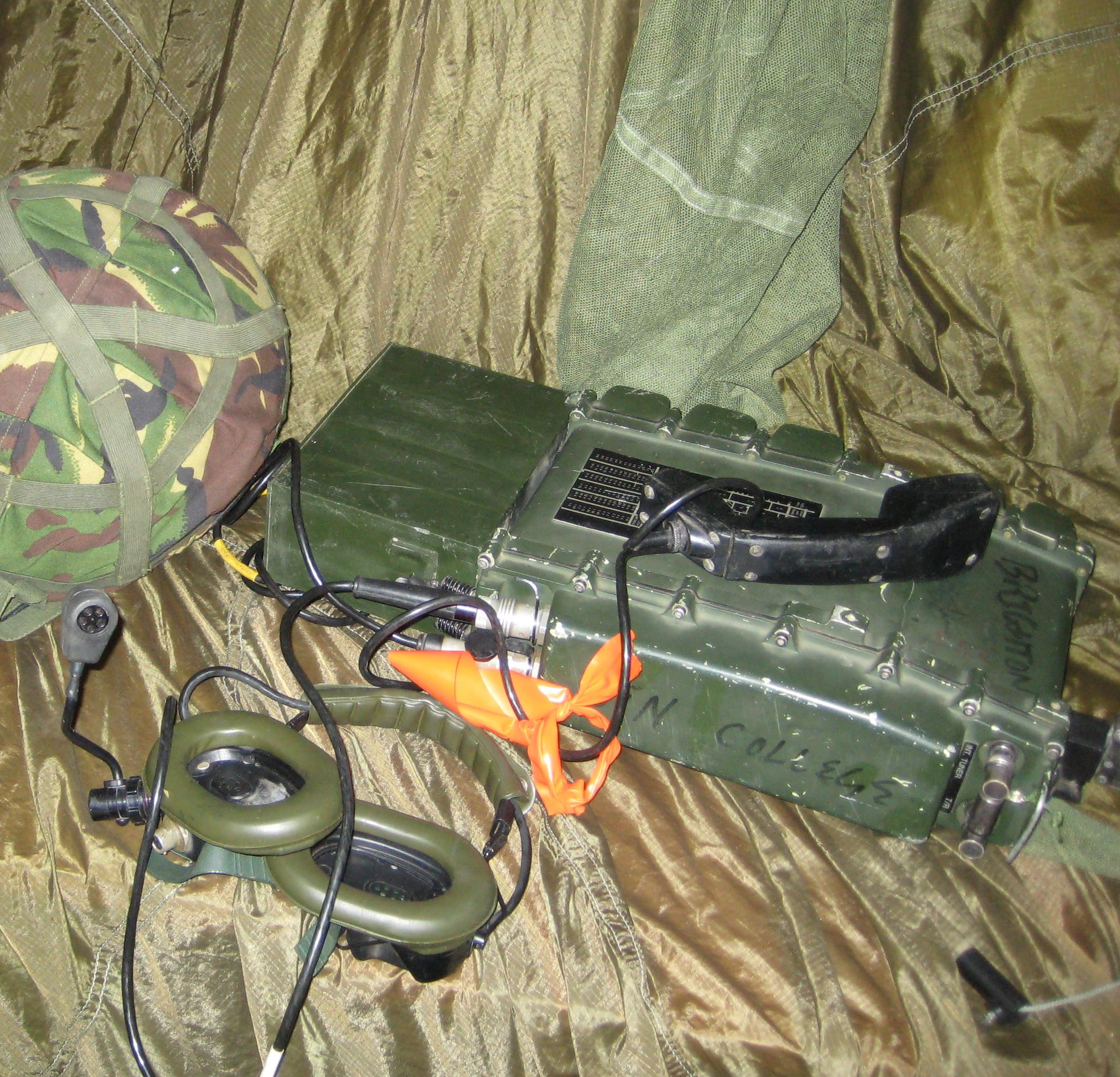
- The PRC 320 HF Radio
- Type: Radio Communications System
- Place of origin: United Kingdom

Service history
- In service: 1978 – 2000, 1982 – ~ 2004
- Used by: British Army and then Army Cadet Force
- Wars: Rhodesian War; Falklands War; Gulf War

Production history
- Designer: SRDE
- Designed: 1970s
- Manufacturer: Racal, Marconi, Mullard Equipment Ltd (MEL) and Plessey
- Produced: 1980s

Clansman is the name of a combat net radio system (CNR) used by the British Army from 1976 to 2010.

Clansman was developed by the Signals Research and Development Establishment in the 1960s, to satisfy a General Staff Requirement laid down in 1965. Clansman represented a considerable advance over the existing Larkspur radio system, and proved to be more flexible, reliable and far lighter. The technological advances in the design of Clansman allowed the introduction of single sideband operation and narrow band frequency modulation to forward area combat net radio for the first time.

Most Clansman radio equipment was built by Racal, Mullard Equipment Ltd (MEL) and Plessey, although headsets and ancillaries were also produced by Amplivox (who were later subsumed into Racal Acoustics), Marconi and others. Clansman was in use by British forces from the late 1970s and saw service in most UK military operations. It was replaced in the mid-2000s by the Bowman communication system.

Clansman continued to be used by the UK Cadet Forces until 2016 when it was finally withdrawn and replaced with a more modern system.

== Family ==
The Clansman family of military radio sets comprised nine main radio units, operating in the High Frequency (HF), Very High Frequency (VHF) and the Ultra High Frequency (UHF) Radio Bands.

Models were designated "UK/PRC" or "UK/VRC", which stand for "United Kingdom / Portable Radio Communications" and "Vehicle Radio Communications" respectively. The radios first came into service in the late 1970s; at that time the main advantage of the Clansman radios was that they were frequency synthesised (using switched channels, as opposed to using a variable tuning scale). This provided frequency stability, obviating the need to tune the radio again, once a frequency was set. Previous UK military radios were much less stable, and had to be frequently tuned, with receiver tuning needing to be tweaked to "pull in" a weak signal.

== Clansman HF radio sets ==
=== UK/PRC 316 ===
A late introduction to the Larkspur range, its original designation was A16 Lightweight HF Radio Station. Deployed in tropical or high temperature climates, it was powered by either a standard 12V battery that connected directly to the set or, if issued, a Leclanché battery that connected directly to the set. It was compatible with most D10 or R4 copper stranded antenna systems that were fielded at that time, examples being the Shirley, Jamaica, Half Jamaica and Yagi.

Despite not being of the Clansman family, its late introduction to service coupled with its Clansman equivalent, the PRC/RT320 not being ready, meant the PRC 316 survived for just over five years after Clansman was introduced. Once the PRC/RT320 was completed and fully fielded, the PRC 316 was rapidly withdrawn. Another reason cited for its retention was that it was relatively easy to operate and was inter-operable with the other HF Radios in the Clansman family.

=== UK/PRC 319 ===
Special Forces and STA Patrol man-portable, patrol level radio HF / VHF, half-duplex transceiver capable of burst transmission which was built in the United Kingdom by MEL. Features include key-pad entry of frequency, mode and data with digital LCD; 10 pairs of pre-programmable channels; half-duplex operation with the option of transmitting and receiving on different channels; the option of using the removable pocket-sized BA-1304 electronic message unit (EMU) to transmit and receive short data communications; fully automatic antenna tuner which can be remoted up to 50m from the set using standard co-ax cable; self-test facility. power output of 50 watts PEP on high power setting with an adjustable low power of 2–5 watts. Frequency range 1.5–40 MHz with upper sideband, data, or CW modulation.

=== UK/PRC 320 ===
An HF/USB/AM/CW transceiver built by Plessey and issued down to company level. The set operates in the 2–29.9999 MHz range with a possible 280,000 channels. RF power output is a selectable 3 or 30 watts. Derived from an earlier prototype known as the B20, the PRC 320 can be used as a manpack (backpack) or vehicular radio and replaced the Larkspur Station Radio (SR) A13 SR C13 and other HF radios in service with the British Army.

The PRC320 can be used with a number of different Clansman antennas that are supplied with the set; a 2.4m whip antenna is supplied for portable manpack operation using HF groundwave communication with a range of up to 30 km (19 mi). Alternatively a dipole antenna can be used for HF skywave operation with a range of up to 320 km (200 mi). The set includes a built-in Antenna Tuning Unit (ATU) which electrically matches the whip antenna length to the radio frequency in use. The ATU can also match any other wire antenna to the operating frequency. The set together with its ancillaries (batteries, cables, audio gear and antenna parts) together make up the complete equipment schedule (CES).

The use of morse code and later data transmission and reception could extend the range and add to the versatility of the UK/PRC 320. A number of data entry devices were produced as add-ons such as MEROD, TDED and Kipling.

Clansman HF sets continued in use by the UK's Cadet Forces until c. 2015. Many of the sets found their way into amateur service after the Clansman system became obsolete.

=== UK/VRC 321 ===
A vehicle-borne high-frequency (HF) transmitter-receiver used for inter-company communications outside of the normal working range of the VHF forward area nets; it can also be used dismounted from a vehicle as a ground station with an external power supply or batteries and antenna system. It was also used for rear link communications up to brigade level and administrative radio nets.

The set uses USB/AM or CW with an RF output of 20–30 watts. It was manufactured by MEL at Crawley in Sussex and replaced the Larkspur SR C13 and C11 R210 HF Vehicle Stations.

The radio is issued together with ancillaries to make up the operating station, including a power cable, antenna tuner unit, coaxial cables and antenna wires. Other accessories such as the selector unit radio frequency (SURF) were available. The SURF, when tuned, allowed more than one set to be operated from the same position without interfering with each other.

The standard antenna tuning unit used with the UK/RT 321 is the Tuning Unit Radio Frequency (TURF) 25 watts. This could be used either attached to the set, or remotely, depending on which antenna configuration was used.

=== UK/VRC 322 ===
A VRC321 station with the addition of a 300 Watt peak envelope power (PEP) linear amplifier (ARF 250W) and appropriate high power antenna tuning unit (TURF 250) manufactured by MEL of Crawley, Sussex.

== Clansman VHF radio sets ==
=== UK/PRC 349 ===
An intra-section level portable VHF FM transceiver. Built by Racal BCC. RF power output is 0.25 watts. Units supplied to the British Army operate in the 37–46.975 MHz range, voice (FM) transmission Mode and 25 kHz channel separation. A high power (2 Watts) output version was also available and any 10 MHz block in the range 30–76 MHz could be supplied. Worn in a holster on the chest or back. The PRC349 was added to the Clansman family in 1972.

=== UK/PRC 350 ===
A short-range VHF set covering 30 to 59.975 MHz. RF power output is 2 Watts.

=== UK/PRC 351/352 ===
An intra-platoon level backpack VHF FM transceiver. Built by Racal BCC. The PRC 351 has 4 watt RF power output, and operates in the 30–75.975 MHz range with a possible 1840 channels spaced 25 kHz apart. This radio is also capable of being mounted on a vehicle in conjunction with the TUAAM. The PRC 352 is identical, with the addition of a 20 watt RF amplifier and can be used as a ground station.

=== UK/VRC 353 ===
A vehicle-mounted VHF FM transceiver built by Marconi Space and Defence Systems. The frequency range and channel separation is the same as the 351/352 with output power settings up to 50 W. Antenna systems are provided to provide improved performance in semi-static situations such as an elevated broadband vertical dipole mounted on an 8-metre mast. The VRC 353 is also capable of data transmission and when used in conjunction with an add-on unit (Digital Master Unit) provides a medium level secure speech network.

The VRC 353 was notable as the only set in the Clansman family to partially employ thermionic valves - a single conduction-cooled tetrode as the transmitter power amplifier which is always in use even at the minimum 100mW power output, and two wired-in pentodes as RF amplifiers in the receiver section. It is often asserted that this was done to provide protection against Electro Magnetic Pulse (EMP) damage arising from a nuclear weapon strike, but was in fact necessary (at the time of design) in order to meet the required specification for dynamic range and adjacent channel performance.

=== UK/PRC 346 ===
A portable backpack or vehicle mount VHF to UHF transceiver built by Raytheon. The frequency range is 30 MHz to 390 MHz. AM and FM modes enabling compatibility with airborne units in the 118 MHz - 149.975 MHz and 225 MHz - 390 MHz aircraft radio bands. Unusually for a military radio, it can also work in duplex modes. Power settings are 2 watts on low power and 7 watts on high. It has interfaces for GPS.

== Clansman UHF radio sets ==
=== UK/PRC 344 ===
A forward air control UHF AM transceiver. Built by Plessey. Operates in 225–399.9 MHz range with 50 kHz steps for a possible 3500 channels. RF power output is rated at 2.5 watts.

== Batteries and charging ==
Manpack and Portable Stations. Re-chargeable batteries were supplied for all of the portable range of radios. The PRC 344, PRC 351, 351/2 and PRC 320 all shared the same common battery – the 24 Volt 3.3 ampere hour Nickel Cadmium (NICAD) type later upgraded to 4 ampere hour (or Ah), and ultimately 5 Ah due to advances in battery manufacture. Each radio would be issued with three batteries, and a range of battery chargers was available for this common battery.

With the exception of the PRC 349 and UK RT 350 which are 12 Volt (nominal), The Manpack and Portable sets and their chargers were almost all nominally rated 24V DC (Direct Current) to match the British Army's choice of 24 Volts to power its vehicle systems. The Direct Current Charging Units (DCCU) was used to float charge (provide a top up charge while the set was in use) the manpack battery, while it was mounted in a vehicle, using a clip in kit for example. It could also provide a full charge cycle over 4.5 Hours from flat, switching itself out of circuit when complete. (A clip-in kit locked the radio in a convenient frame for rapid deployment when dismounting, and had the charger as part of the installation.) There were a few exceptions where 24 Volts was not used in vehicles, such as in the General Service (GS) Land Rover where a 12v system was used for example. A 12 Volt DCCU was provided. The Clansman 24V 4Ah Nickel Cadmium Battery was prolific and for convenience an Alternating Current Charging Unit (ACCU) was provided for use in barracks where up to sixteen batteries could be charged simultaneously or singularly.

All of these chargers worked in the same manner, basically providing an appropriate charging current while sensing the battery temperature to detect when charging was complete, achieved by measuring the voltage across two sets of a series pair of silicon diodes in the battery itself. One series pair would sense the internal temperature of the cells the other series pair fitted close to the outer case of the battery to sense ambient temperature, the difference in temperature being used to determine the state of charge. One drawback of the Clansman 24V 4Ah NICAD is that failure of these diodes makes batteries unserviceable. A further problem was that if the diode connection became disconnected or intermittent due to insecure connectors or cable wear, charge end point was not detected and charging continued at full rate until battery damage occurred. In extreme cases batteries left on charge exploded due to internal gas generation. Capacity reduction due to partial charge cycles also occurred due to the 'memory effect' of the Nicad cells. A discharge/charge process could have prevented such failures, but was not provided for in either the DC or ACCU. Specialists can rebuild the unserviceable Clansman NICAD battery.

Later an intelligent battery management system (IBMS) was provided which automatically conditioned one or more batteries, a process which ensured only complete charge cycles were applied, in order to avoid the NICAD memory effect.

The PRC 349 was originally intended for use with 1.5V AAA Alkaline batteries and provided with a cassette to hold them. As these became more expensive a variety of mains adapters, nickel cadmium batteries and Lithium batteries came into service.

The PRC 350 had its own 14V 4Ah NICAD and a battery cassette holding 14 primary Alkaline or Dry Cells giving a nominal rated voltage of 21V.

A lithium version was later introduced as a lightweight replacement for the 24V 4Ah NICAD.

Vehicle Sets. These were nominally 24 Volt and were powered by lead acid batteries which were charged by the vehicle alternator, an auxiliary engine fitted to the vehicle, or a charging engine or generator – particularly when ground mounted or static.

AC Adapters, Transformers and Switched Mode Power Supplies. A number of AC Mains units were provided so that sets could be used in barracks.

Later – a series of adaptors such as the ADAPTER CHARGER DC 14.4/24.V. came into service which when added to the DCCU could be used to charge multiple and various batteries – charging 2x 14V or 2x 24V NICADS for example.

== Clansman Control Harness and accessories ==
Clansman Control Harness refers to a range of accessories which were fitted into vehicles for the purpose of controlling the set(s) and providing other features such as loud speakers, a vehicle intercom system, and switching between two radio sets. Control boxes provided the switching and facilities to plug the audio gear into.

Green or black faced control boxes were the standard type. Later, yellow faced boxes were introduced that supported Automatic Noise Reduction (ANR) functionality. These required new headsets to be used with them to work properly, although the older ones were still compatible. Red faced control boxes were used for encrypted systems.

== Clansman audio gear ==
A range of audio gear for use in various roles are commonly provided such as the Lightweight 'B' Vehicle and Infantry Headset (Headset BV and I), the Clansman Handset, a Pressel (Press to Talk or PTT) switch and the Audio Gear Staff User (AGS). The AGS featured Sonovalve technology – a feature designed to allow background noise into the headset through a special valve. In armoured fighting vehicles an Electronic Automatic Noise Reducing System was provided.

== Clansman accessories ==
=== IBRU (Interconnecting Box Radio-rebroadcast Unit) ===
Used in conjunction with the "Harness" point on VRC 353 and VRC 321 units, to operate 2 or more sets as a ReBroadcast ("rebro"). This quasi repeater function allows two or more networks, on different frequencies, to be combined, effectively increasing the ground size of the net. For instance, a vehicle using whip antennas may only be able to communicate 30 km; though placing a rebro vehicle 30 km away could extend this to 60 km by re-broadcasting the signal on a second net. On US systems, this functionality is/was called RETRANS (for retransmission).

=== DMU ===
A Digital Master Unit or DMU is used to provide digital communications and to provide secure encrypted communications on a VHF network, when working to similarly equipped radios. This required additional equipment such as the BID 250 and associated Crypto key material.

=== SURF ===
A SURF (Selector Unit Radio Frequency) is used to prevent interference to operation of the radio sets. The SURF is an electrical filter, designed to reject unwanted interference from other radios when operating in close proximity to each other. The SURF is tuned using a manual control on the front of the unit, so that only the frequency in use, and those close to it, are accepted by the set. A Range of SURFs were provided for attachment to the VHF PRC350, PRC351/2 (SURF 4 Watt) and also the HF PRC320 (SURF 12 Watt) and VRC 321 (SURF 25 Watt).

== Antenna tuning and matching ==
=== TURF ===
A TURF (Tuning Unit Radio Frequency) is an Antenna Tuning Unit or ATU. It is used to artificially lengthen the antenna (or tune it) Often at HF wavelengths for example an antenna would be physically too long to attach to a radio without affecting portability and manoeuvrability. A shorter vehicle whip was more practicable and also field antennas were constructed with for example, vertical radiators constructed using the Racal 8 or 12 metre masts. Because these were an electrical compromise, they had to be tuned by use of a TURF (or electrically matched to the set). The TURF 25 Watt (a separate unit to the radio) is considered mandatory when using the VRC321: it tunes both unbalanced, end fed wires and whips and also balanced antennas such as the dipole.

An antenna tuning unit is built into the manpack PRC 320. The TURF requires users to manually tune the antenna, unlike the VHF TUAAM which is an Automatic Tuning Unit.

=== TUAAM ===
A TUAAM (Tuning Unit Automatic Antenna Matching) is an ATU which matches the standard vehicle antenna at VHF and which is used mainly with the VRC 353 and PRC 351/2 (when used with the clip-in kit and mounted in a vehicle). The TUAAM automatically tunes the antenna, and artificially shortens it rather than lengthening it, but essentially it performs the same function as a TURF. The TUAAM was a commercial product of Racal-BCC (BCC 543) and was adopted after the original SRDE design failed trials testing. Note that the actual TUUAM is fitted inside a 'Wing Mounting Box' which itself is fitted to a special mount, permanently fitted to the host vehicle.

== Clansman antenna ==
A Range of antennas specially manufactured for use with Clansman Radio:

=== Elevated VHF Antenna (EVHF) ===
An elevated end fed dipole for use with the VHF Radio to extend the range when mounted on an 8 or 12 metre Mast.

== See also ==
- BATCO Battle Code encryption system
