= Larkspur radio system =

British tactical radio system

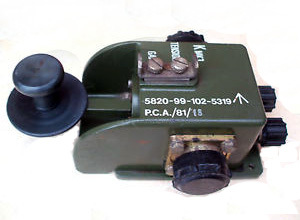
Larkspur telegraph key

Larkspur was the retrospectively adopted name of a tactical radio system used by the British Army. Its development started in the late 1940s with the first equipment being issued in the mid-1950s. It remained in service until replaced by Clansman in the late-1970s although some elements of Larkspur were still in service well into the 1980s. It was widely exported to British Commonwealth armies and other friendly nations.

The origin of Larkspur was a post-war project to move tactical short-range radio communications in the forward battle area from HF using amplitude modulation to low-band VHF using frequency modulation. This followed the similar move by the US Army in the latter part of WWII which had demonstrated significant advantages. Where the use of VHF was not practical, HF sets using narrow band phase modulation (NBPhM) were developed as the only practical method at the time of obtaining some performance improvement over the use of AM especially at night.

The range of sets originally comprised the vehicle VHF sets C42, C45, B45, B47, B48 and the C13 vehicle HF transceiver, all of which were designed to specifications produced by the government Signals Research and Development Establishment (SRDE) at Christchurch, Dorset and initially designated as the "New Range" to differentiate them from wartime legacy radios. They were characterized by similar appearance, tuning drills, frequency indication using film strip displays, the use of relatively simple architecture that avoided complex switching as far as possible and using commonly available components and a degree of modularity in construction. Plessey Mk.IV connectors were used extensively in the sets and accessories.

An important operational advance was that the sets incorporated internal calibration facilities which meant that they could be accurately pre-set on a frequency without radiating any signal. This enabled all stations in a net to be confidently pre-tuned on the same channel and eliminated the old compromising "Tuning and Netting Call" system that advertised the presence of activity to an enemy.

All the sets were constructed in strong hermetically sealed alloy enclosures - a measure that had been found to be essential to ensure durability and reliability during the previous war, and were sized to fit a standardized range of vehicle mountings. A range of control and distribution accessories known as a harness to enable radio facilities to be accessed from various points in a vehicle was also produced.

Initially, roll-out of the VHF New Range sets was restricted to the Royal Armoured Corps and the Royal Artillery, reflecting the fact that these formed the "teeth" elements likely to be involved in meeting any perceived threat of a Soviet advance across northern Europe. In 1962 a project to re-equip the remainder of the army was undertaken and given the name Larkspur, the name officially becoming retrospectively applied to the original New Range sets and eventually by common use becoming a technically incorrect generic label for virtually any radio equipment used by the British Army between the end of WWII and the arrival of the Clansman Combat Net Radio family.

The HF set of the family, the C13 was included for use as a short-range combat net radio in circumstances where VHF was unsuitable and could also be used (using AM or CW) for longer range operation by exploiting skywave and near-vertical incidence propagation techniques. Originally conceived as a replacement for the wartime Wireless Set No. 19, it was enhanced during development by the addition of Narrow Band Phase Modulation (NBPhM) facilities to improve the performance and communications reliability at short range particularly at night when ionospheric changes cause increased interference levels. This was accomplished by the use of angle modulation effectively doubling the output power compared to AM and exploiting the capture effect of the mode. A complementary manpack HF set, the A13, was also equipped with NBPhM facilities.

The C13 and A13 entered service in the early 1960s with the A13 notable for being the only set in the original range that employed transistors exploiting developments in semiconductors to reduce weight and size, and a rechargeable nickel-cadmium battery

VHF manpack sets of the era were derived from established designs with the Station Radio A41 and A42 being developed from the US AN/PRC-10 and PRC-9 respectively and the A40 adapted from the Canadian C/PRC-26. Other sets developed commercially were bought in to meet specialist requirements or circumstances, examples being the HF156, A14 (BCC30), the Australian A510, Redifon A43R and the Pye C12.

Various other sets such as the B70 UHF carrier telephony relay, C11/R210 HF transmitter/receiver for Royal Signals use, and the Marconi transmitter D11 and its associated receiver, the R230 were commercial developments adopted as standard sets by the British services.

Manufacture of the equipment was carried out by Plessey, E K Cole (EKCO), Mullard Equipment Ltd (MEL), Murphy Radio, The British Communications Corporation (BCC), Redifon and others.

== Trivia ==
Despite being developed for re-equipping the post-war British army, the first delivery of Larkspur equipment went to Nigeria.
