= MCR-1 radio =

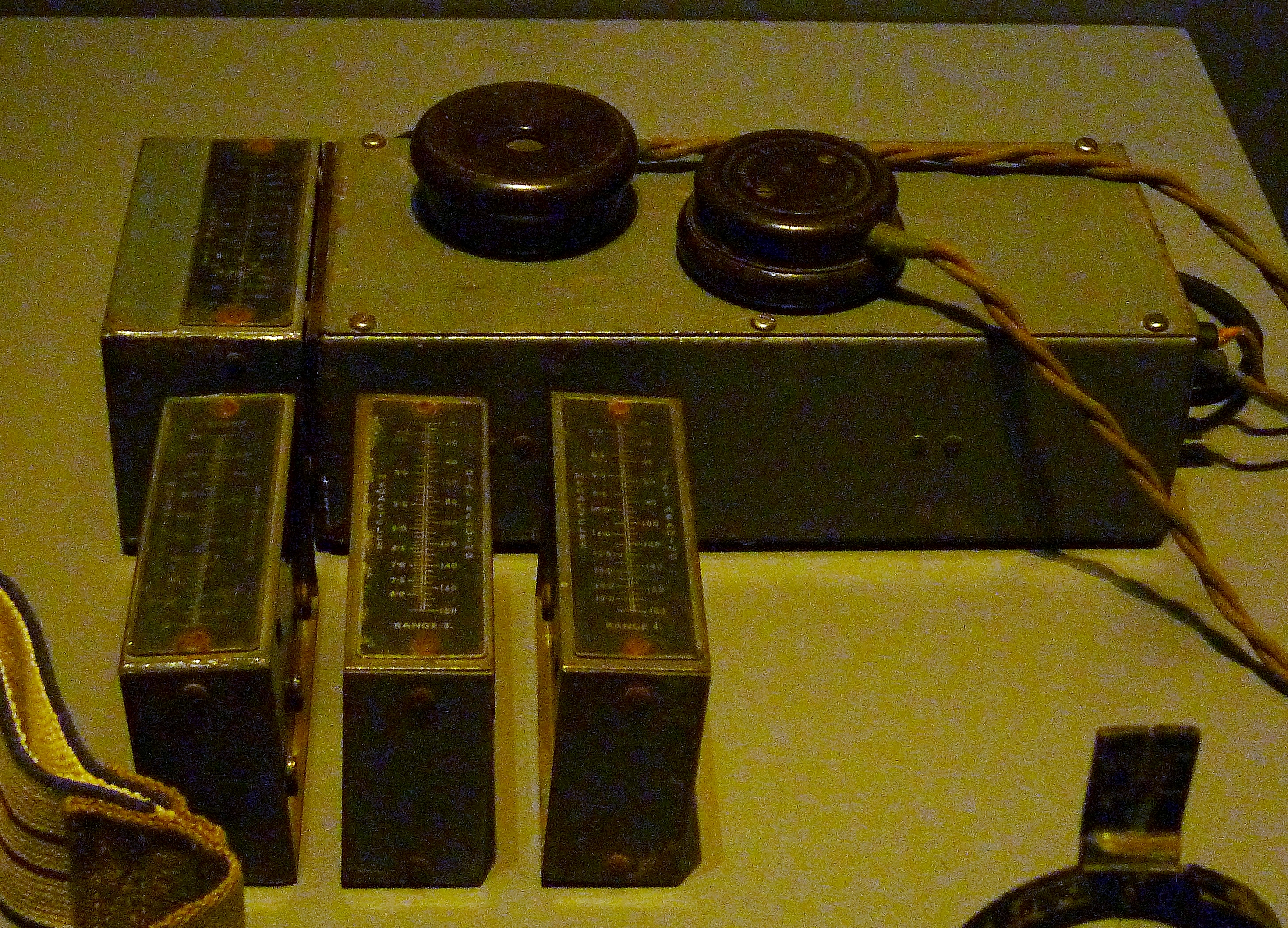
MCR-1 radio

The MCR-1 (Miniature Communications Receiver, Type 36/I) was a clandestine radio receiver developed in 1943 by Captain John Brown of the British Special Operations Executive (SOE) and manufactured by Philco UK.

The device was Parachute-inserted into German-occupied Europe inside steel Huntley & Palmers biscuit tins to help underground resistance fighters listen to coded BBC broadcasts and secret messages. Around over 30,000 units were produced during World War II. American OSS agent Virginia Hall notably used the MCR-1 to orchestrate sabotage operations.

After WW2, the MCR-1 was copied in Belgium by MBLE (Manufacture Belge De Lampes Et De Matériel Electronique) for stay-behind cells during the Cold war.
