= Wireless Set No. 19 =

British Army tactical radio

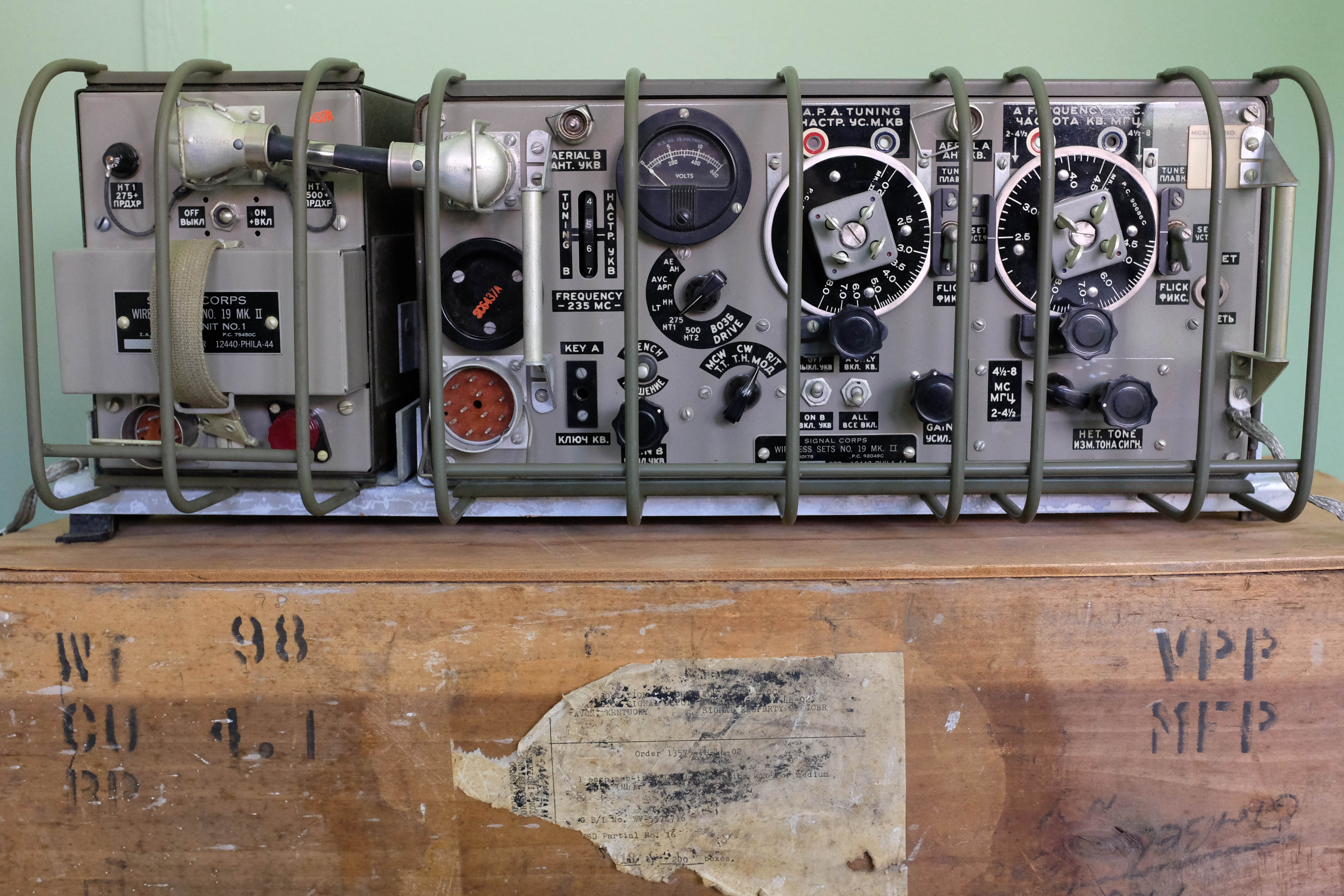
Wireless Set No. 19 MK II at the Infoage museum

The Wireless Set No. 19 was a Second World War mobile radio transceiver designed for use by armoured troops of the British Army. First introduced in 1940, the No. 19 began to replace the pre-war Wireless Set No. 11. Two modified versions were introduced, Mk. II in 1941 and Mk. III in 1942. An improved version from Canada was introduced in 1942 for use primarily with other forces. In British service, the No. 19 was replaced in the post-war era by the Larkspur radio system. Canadian-built No. 19s saw continued service for many years with a variety of users.

== Purpose ==
Designed for use in tanks and armoured vehicles, the radio provided three communication channels:

- The A set provided longer range communications within the squadron or regiment.
- The B set or "troop set" provided short range communication between tanks in a troop.
- The IC channel provided internal communication between crewmembers inside the tank.

A rear-link tank in the HQ unit would join its A-set to a wider network, and relay relevant messages to the commander on the B set. This would extend a squadron net to the regiment, or a regimental net to the wider brigade/division.

== Operation ==
A series of control boxes and junction boxes provided distribution within the vehicle. The wireless operator and commander could select the different sets. The driver and loader were on the IC only.

In normal use the three channels were mixed onto the IC for monitoring. The commander or operator could then select the A or B sets to remove them from the IC and allow push-to-talk. A warning lamp would light if both were on the B set, leaving the A set unmonitored. Later control boxes allowed the commander or operator to rebroadcast A onto B or vice versa for message relay.

The other crew members could only use the IC. The driver's control box incorporated a push button to activate a buzzer, allowing the commander's attention to be brought back to the IC if a situation requiring his attention arose.

A high power version of the 19 set was also developed, allowing longer range use of the A set, liaising with primary command. Command and link/relay vehicles had provision to operate two A sets, one of which could be a high-power variant.

Later in the war, the importance of co-operation with infantry added a Wireless Set No. 38 alongside, with new control boxes to operate both radios together. Initially the standard infantry 38 set was used with its own separate battery and ancillaries, but later the WS 38 AFV was developed specifically to complement the 19 set in a vehicle setup.

== Specifications ==
The set was designed to allow MF and HF communication between tanks.

- Dimensions (l × d × w):

Mk II and Mk III complete - 27 × 10 × 13.25 in (68.6 × 25.4 × 33.7 cm)
Sender/receiver - 17.5 × 8.25 × 12.25 in (44.5 × 21.0 × 31.1 cm); supply unit - 6 × 8.25 × 12.5 in (15.2 × 21.0 × 31.8 cm)

- Weight:

Mk II complete - 86.25 lb (39.12 kg)
Sender/receiver - 40.5 lb (18.4 kg); supply unit - 28.5 lb (12.9 kg); carrier no. 1 - 14.75 lb (6.69 kg)

Mk III complete - 88.25 lb (40.03 kg)
Sender/receiver - 40.5 lb (18.4 kg); supply unit - 30.5 lb (13.8 kg); carrier no. 1 - 14.75 lb (6.69 kg)

- Frequency range: 'A' setting 2–8 MHz; 'B' setting 229–241 MHz. Master Oscillator controlled.
- Modes: AM voice, MCW, CW.
- VHF inter-tank communications
- Crew intercom
- Single dial receive and transmit tuning
- "Flick" switch for rapid frequency change
- RF output: 'A' setting 2.5–9 watts.
- Range: 'A' set 10 miles (16 km); 'B' set 1,000 yards (910 m) (between moving vehicles).

== History ==
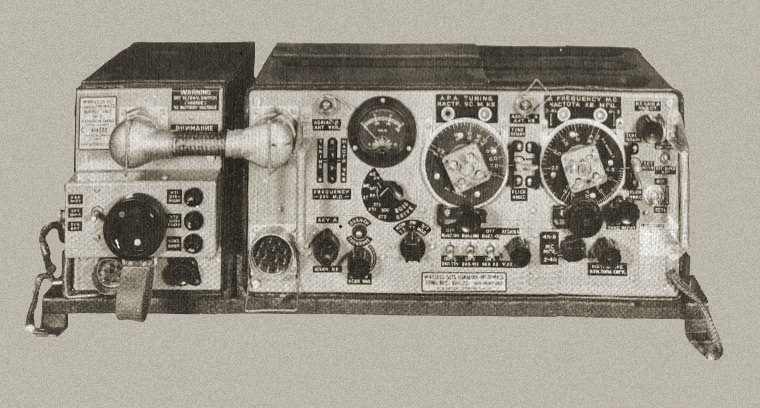
Wireless Set No. 19 MK III

The Wireless Set No. 19 was developed in 1940 by the British War Office's Signals Experimental Establishment and by Pye Radio. The Pye model was replaced with the MK II model in 1941, and the MK III model in 1942. The sets proved valuable for armoured fighting in the Western Desert.

In 1942, the No. 19 Mk II was produced in Canada by Northern Electric, Canadian Marconi and RCA Victor. The British design was improved and interchangeability of components such as the valves, was instituted. A majority of Canadian sets used English/Cyrillic front panel lettering, the result of a Lend-Lease contract to the Soviet Red Army.

Post-war, forward area battle group radio traffic carried by Wireless Set No. 19 nets was progressively migrated to low-band VHF using a more modern generation of radios known as the New Range, later to become known as Larkspur. This employed FM and replaced the No. 19 in this role from 1954. As a result, the No. 19's VHF 'B' section was abandoned and removed when sets were overhauled. The Royal Armoured Corps No. 19 sets were mostly replaced in the mid-1950s with a militarized version of the PYE PTC-202 known as the C12 as an interim measure, which were subsequently replaced with the C13 from 1960. An additional RF amplifier for the No. 19 (Amplifier, RF No. 2) increased the daylight operational range up to about 45 miles (72 km). The experimental Wireless Set No. 19 TH (built for the Dutch Army) featured increased frequency coverage up to 12 MHz.

Post-war, the Canadian No. 19 MK II and III was used in the Danish and Italian Army, and some Canadian No. 19 MK III sets were used by the British Army.

The No. 19 Mk III in a simplified configuration was still on issue to British cadet units as an operational training station as late as the mid-1970s.

Today the Wireless Set No. 19 is collected, restored and operated by vintage amateur radio enthusiasts.

== See also ==
- SCR-694
- SCR-508 WWII American tank radio set
- List of British Army radio sets
