= Wireless Set No. 62 =

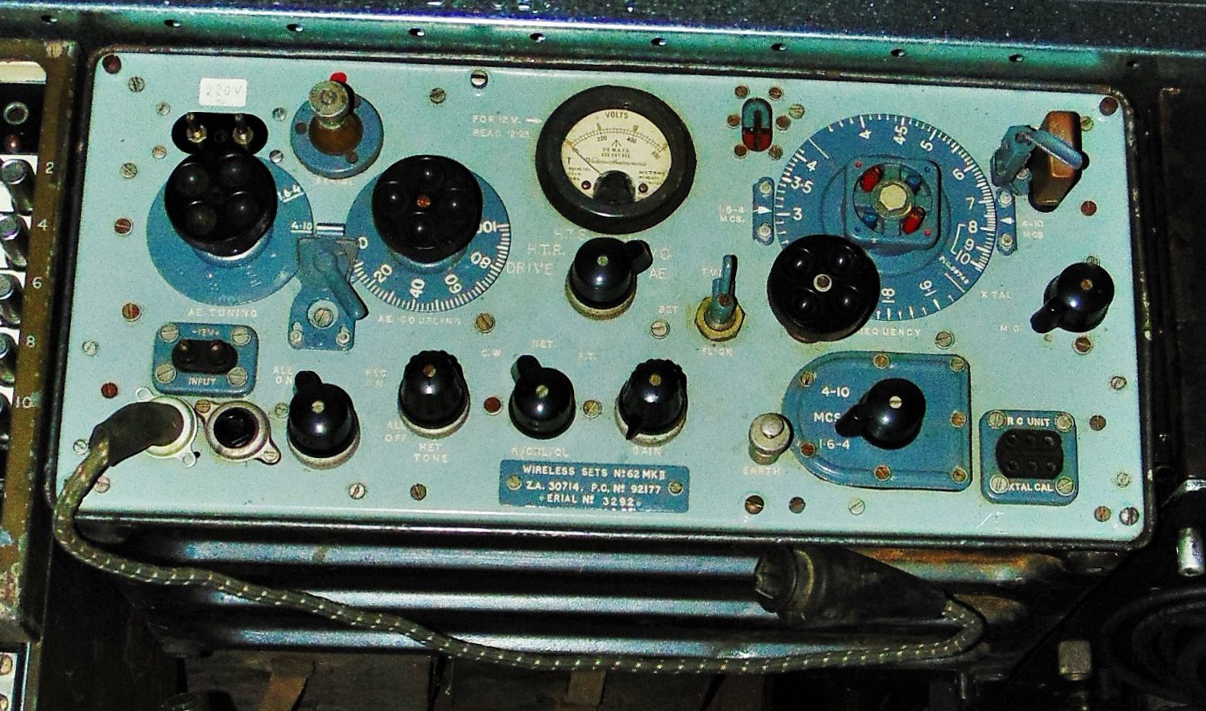
Wireless Set No. 62

The Wireless Set No. 62 was a British Army HF band radio transceiver. Introduced by Pye during the later part of World War II as a light-weight and waterproof replacement for the Wireless Set No. 22. Although intended as an interim design, it remained in production until 1966.

== Technical specifications ==
- AM, Superheterodyne radio transceiver.
- Frequency coverage: 1.6 to 4.00 MHz and 4.0 to 10.0 MHz in two switched ranges.
- Receiver sensitivity (20 dB signal-to-noise ratio when modulated 30% at 400 cycles): 1.6 to 4.00 MHz, better than 3 μV; 4.0 to 10.00 MHz, better than 6 μV.
- Intermediate frequency: 460 kHz
- Receiver Audio output: 200 MW at 1 kHz
- Transmitter RF output: 1 W
- Circuitry: 11 valves
- Weight: WS62 transceiver unit (excluding accessories) - 13.7 kg
- Dimensions: 515 x 260 x 324 mm
- Power Supply: 12 V DC at 3.0 to 5.0 Amps from external batteries, powering an internal rotary transformer (motor-generator). Later models used a transistorized inverter power supply.
- Antenna Systems:
  - Mobile station: vertical rod aerials 4 ft, 8 ft or 14 ft high
  - Fixed station: vertical ground mounted 32 ft mast
  - Fixed station: horizontal 100 ft long end-fed wire (adjustable)
- Used Crystal Calibrator No. 10 as an external frequency reference
