= Wireless Set No. 18 =

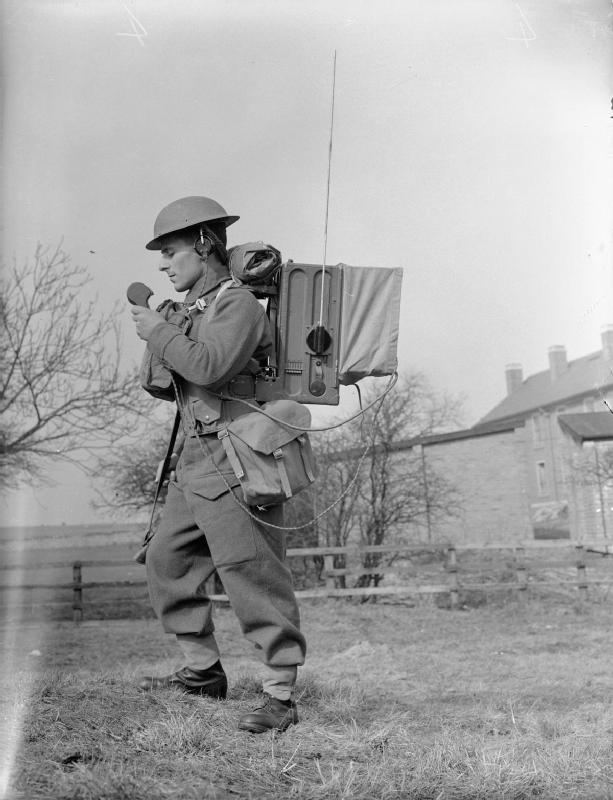
Wireless Set No. 18 in use during a training exercise in 1941

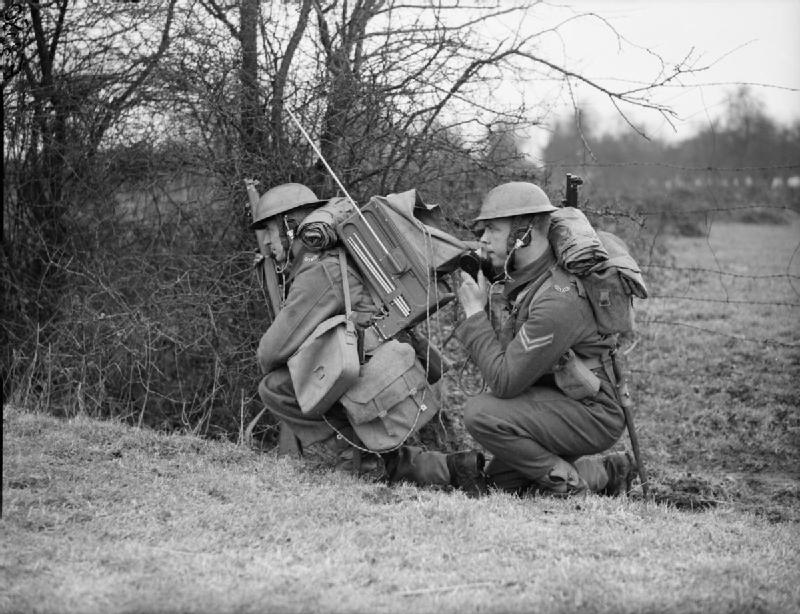
Wireless Set No. 18 in France during 1940

The Wireless Set No. 18 was a High frequency (HF) portable man-pack radio transceiver used by the British Army during World War II. Frequency coverage was 6 to 9MHz with an RF output of 0.25W. Range was up to 10 miles.

== See also ==
- List of radios
