= List of acts of the Parliament of Victoria from 1958 =

This is a list of acts of the Parliament of Victoria, Australia for the year 1958.

== 1958 ==
| Short title, or popular name | Citation | Royal assent |
Long title
| Milk Board (Members) Act 1958 | No. 6171 | 15 April 1958 |
An Act to amend Section Seven of the Milk Board Act 1933 (Note: Milk Board Act 1933 (No. 4183)) with respect to the Remuneration and Service of the Members of the Milk Board and to make other provision in relation thereto.
| | No. 6172 | 15 April 1958 |
An Act to apply out of the Consolidated Revenue the sum of Nine million one hundred and twenty-two thousand three hundred and seventy pounds to the service of the year One thousand nine hundred and fifty-eight and One thousand nine hundred and fifty-nine.
| Footscray (Lawson-street) Land Act 1958 (repealed) | No. 6173 | 15 April 1958 |
An Act to provide for the Closing of Portion of a certain Street in the City of Footscray. (Repealed by Statute Law Revision Act 1984 (No. 10087))
| Railways (Contracts) Act 1958 | No. 6174 | 15 April 1958 |
An Act to amend Section Forty-seven of the Railways Act 1928. (Note: Railways Act 1928 (19 Geo. V. No. 3759))
| Game (Destruction) Act 1958 | No. 6175 | 15 April 1958 |
An Act to further amend Section Eleven of the Game Act 1928. (Note: Game Act 1928 (19 Geo. V. No. 3689))
| Western Metropolitan Market (Amendment) Act 1958 (repealed) | No. 6176 | 15 April 1958 |
An Act to amend Section Nine of the Western Metropolitan Market Act 1938. (Note: Western Metropolitan Market Act 1938 (No. 4623)) (Repealed by Statute Law Revision Act 1995 (No. 11 of 1995))
| Local Government (Portland) Act 1958 | No. 6177 | 15 April 1958 |
An Act to enable the Council of the Town of Portland to sell the Gas Undertaking of the said Council.
| Melbourne (Flinders-street) Land Act 1958 | No. 6178 | 15 April 1958 |
An Act to provide that certain Land vested in the City of Melbourne shall be reserved as a Site for Municipal Purposes.
| Public Account Advances (Home Builders' Account) Act 1958 | No. 6179 | 15 April 1958 |
An Act to amend the Housing (Commonwealth and State Agreement) Act 1957 (Note: Housing (Commonwealth and State Agreement) Act 1957 (No. 6075)) to authorize the temporary Issue and Application of Moneys out of the Public Account and the Transfer thereof to the Home Builders' Account.
| Snowy Mountains Hydro-electric Agreements Act 1958 (repealed) | No. 6180 | 15 April 1958 |
An Act to ratify the Execution for and on behalf of the State of Victoria of certain Agreements between the said State the Commonwealth of Australia and the State of New South Wales in relation to the Snowy Mountains Hydro-electric Scheme and to approve the Agreements so executed, and for other purposes. (Repealed by Snowy Hydro Corporatisation Act 1997 (No. 105 of 1997))
| Gas and Fuel Corporation (Bendigo Undertaking) Act 1958 | No. 6181 | 15 April 1958 |
An Act relating to the Purchase by the Gas and Fuel Corporation of Victoria of the Gas Undertaking of the Bendigo Gas Company.
| | No. 6182 | 15 April 1958 |
An Act to make Provision with respect to the Repeal of Amending Acts.
| Railways (Employés) Act 1958 or the Railways (Employees) Act 1958 | No. 6183 | 15 April 1958 |
An Act to repeal Section One hundred and forty and Sub-section (2) of Section One hundred and fifty-nine of the Railways Act 1928.
| Monash University Act 1958 (repealed) | No. 6184 | 15 April 1958 |
An Act to provide for the Establishment and Incorporation of a University to be known as Monash University, and for other purposes. (Repealed by Monash University Act 2009 (No. 76 of 2009))
| University (Council) Act 1958 | No. 6185 | 15 April 1958 |
An Act to provide for Representation of the Council of Monash University upon the Council of the University of Melbourne.
| Marriage (Amendment) Act 1957 | No. 6186 | 16 April 1958 (Note: This act was reserved for approval by Her Majesty.) |
An Act to amend the Marriage Act 1928, (Note: Marriage Act 1928 (19 Geo. V. No. 3726)) and for other purposes.
| | No. 6187 | 22 July 1958 |
An Act to apply out of the Consolidated Revenue the sum of Twenty-eight million five hundred and twenty-four thousand eight hundred and ten pounds to the service of the year One thousand nine hundred and fifty-eight and One thousand nine hundred and fifty-nine.
| Acts Enumeration and Revision Act 1958 | No. 6188 | 30 September 1958 |
An Act to enumerate the Consolidating Acts of the Legislature of Victoria passed in the year One thousand nine hundred and fifty-eight and to state the Effect of and Rules of Construction applicable to such Acts and to provide that certain Enactments of the Legislature of New South Wales and of the Legislature of Victoria passed before the first of September One thousand nine hundred and fifty-eight shall be repealed and to enumerate the Unrepealed and Unconsolidated Enactments of such Legislatures.
| Acts Interpretation Act 1958 (repealed) | No. 6189 | 30 September 1958 |
An Act to consolidate the Law relating to the Interpretation of Legislative Enactments and for Shortening the Language used therein. (Repealed by Interpretation of Legislation Act 1984 (No. 10096))
| Aborigines Act 1958 | No. 6190 | 30 September 1958 |
An Act to consolidate the Law relating to the Aboriginal Natives of Victoria, and for other purposes.
| Administration and Probate Act 1958 | No. 6191 | 30 September 1958 |
An Act to consolidate the Law relating to the Administration of the Estates of Deceased Persons.
| Adoption of Children Act 1958 | No. 6192 | 30 September 1958 |
An Act to consolidate the Law relating to the Adoption of Infants.
| Agent-General's Act 1958 (repealed) | No. 6193 | 30 September 1958 |
An Act to consolidate the Law relating to the Agent-General for Victoria. (Repealed by Agent-General's Act 1994 (No. 11 of 1994))
| Agricultural Colleges Act 1958 (repealed) | No. 6194 | 30 September 1958 |
An Act to consolidate the Law relating to State Agricultural Colleges. (Repealed by Victorian College of Agriculture and Horticulture Act 1982 (No. 9812))
| Agricultural Education Act 1958 | No. 6195 | 30 September 1958 |
An Act to consolidate the Law relating to Agricultural Education.
| Agricultural Lime Act 1958 (repealed) | No. 6196 | 30 September 1958 |
An Act to consolidate the Law relating to the Sale of Agricultural Lime. (Repealed by Fertilizers Act 1974 (No. 8604))
| Air Navigation Act 1958 (repealed) | No. 6197 | 30 September 1958 |
An Act to consolidate the Law providing for the Application of the Commonwealth Air Regulations to and in relation to Air Navigation within the State of Victoria. (Repealed by Australian Airlines (Intrastate Services) Act 1990 (No. 15 of 1990))
| Anzac Day Act 1958 or the ANZAC Day Act 1958 | No. 6198 | 30 September 1958 |
An Act to consolidate the Law relating to Anzac Day.
| Apprenticeship Act 1958 (repealed) | No. 6199 | 30 September 1958 |
An Act to consolidate the Law relating to Apprenticeship. (Repealed by Industrial Training Act 1975 (No. 8706))
| Arbitration Act 1958 (repealed) | No. 6200 | 30 September 1958 |
An Act to consolidate the Law relating to Arbitration. (Repealed by Commercial Arbitration Act 1984 (No. 10167))
| Architects Act 1958 | No. 6201 | 30 September 1958 |
An Act to consolidate the Law relating to the Registration of Architects.
| Auction Sales Act 1958 (repealed) | No. 6202 | 30 September 1958 |
An Act to consolidate the Law relating to Sales by Auction and Auctioneers. (Repealed by Auction Sales (Repeal) Act 2001 (No. 84 of 2001))
| Audit Act 1958 | No. 6203 | 30 September 1958 |
An Act to consolidate the Law relating to the Collection and Payment of the Public Moneys the Audit of the Public Account and other Accounts and the Protection and Recovery of the Public Property, and for other purposes.
| Bakers and Millers Act 1958 | No. 6204 | 30 September 1958 |
An Act to consolidate the Law relating to Bakers and Millers.
| Bank Holidays Act 1958 (repealed) | No. 6205 | 30 September 1958 |
An Act to consolidate the Law relating to Bank Holidays. (Repealed by Public Holidays Act 1993 (No. 119 of 1993))
| Barley Marketing Act 1958 | No. 6206 | 30 September 1958 |
An Act to consolidate the Law relating to the Marketing of Barley and other Matters incidental thereto.
| Bees Act 1958 | No. 6207 | 30 September 1958 |
An Act to consolidate the Law relating to Diseases of Bees.
| Benefit Associations Act 1958 (repealed) | No. 6208 | 30 September 1958 |
An Act to consolidate the Law relating to the Registration of Sickness Hospital Medical and Funeral Benefit Associations, and for other purposes. (Repealed by Benefit Associations (Repeal) Act 2001 (No. 17 of 2001))
| Boilers Inspection Act 1958 | No. 6209 | 30 September 1958 |
An Act to consolidate the Law relating to the Inspection and Regulation of Boilers.
| Building Societies Act 1958 (repealed) | No. 6210 | 30 September 1958 |
An Act to consolidate the Law relating to Building Societies. (Repealed by Building Societies Act 1976 (No. 8966))
| Business Investigations Act 1958 (repealed) | No. 6211 | 30 September 1958 |
An Act to consolidate the Law relating to the Investigation of the Affairs of certain Businesses and Restrictions on the Offering of Interests in Certain Businesses for Subscription or Purchase, and for other purposes. (Repealed by Business Investigations (Repeal) Act 2001 (No. 56 of 2001))
| Business Names Act 1958 | No. 6212 | 30 September 1958 |
An Act to consolidate the Law relating to the Registration of Firms and Persons carrying on Business under Business Names and relating to the Names Styles Titles or Designations under which Businesses are carried on.
| Cancer Act 1958 (repealed) | No. 6213 | 30 September 1958 |
An Act to consolidate the Law relating to the Anti-Cancer Council of Victoria and the Cancer Institute and for other purposes. (Repealed by Improving Cancer Outcomes Act 2014 (No. 78 of 2014))
| Carriers and Innkeepers Act 1958 (repealed) | No. 6214 | 30 September 1958 |
An Act to consolidate the Law relating to Carriers Innkeepers and Others. (Repealed by Australian Consumer Law and Fair Trading Act 2012 (No. 21 of 2012))
| Cattle Breeding Act 1958 (repealed) | No. 6215 | 30 September 1958 |
An Act to consolidate the Law relating to Improving the Breeds of Cattle. (Repealed by Agriculture Acts (Repeal) Act 1980 (No. 9456))
| Cattle Compensation Act 1958 | No. 6216 | 30 September 1958 |
An Act to consolidate the Law relating to the Provision of Compensation for the Owners of certain Cattle.
| Cemeteries Act 1958 (repealed) | No. 6217 | 30 September 1958 |
An Act to consolidate the Law relating to Cemeteries and Cremation. (Repealed by Cemeteries and Crematoria Act 2003 (No. 80 of 2003))
| Children's Court Act 1958 (repealed) | No. 6218 | 30 September 1958 |
An Act to consolidate the Law relating to Children's Courts. (Repealed by Children's Court Act 1973 (No. 8477))
| Children's Welfare Act 1958 | No. 6219 | 30 September 1958 |
An Act to consolidate the Law to provide for and promote the Welfare Protection and Care of Children and Young Persons.
| Clean Air Act 1958 (repealed) | No. 6220 | 30 September 1958 |
An Act to consolidate the Law making Provision for Abating the Pollution of the Air. (Repealed by Environment Protection (Clean Air) Act 1981 (No. 9571))
| Coal Mines Act 1958 or the Coal Mines (Pensions) Act 1958 | No. 6221 | 30 September 1958 |
An Act to consolidate the Law relating to Coal Mines and Coal Mine Workers.
| Commercial Goods Vehicles Act 1958 (repealed) | No. 6222 | 30 September 1958 |
An Act to consolidate the Law relating to Commercial Goods Vehicles. (Repealed by Transport (Deregulation) Act 1980 (No. 9511))
| Commonwealth Arrangements Act 1958 | No. 6223 | 30 September 1958 |
An Act to consolidate the Law providing for certain matters in Victoria in connexion with the Commonwealth.
| Constitution Act Amendment Act 1958 (repealed) | No. 6224 | 30 September 1958 |
An Act to consolidate the Law relating to the Amendment of the Constitution. (Repealed by Superannuation Legislation Amendment Act 2013 (No. 61 of 2013))
| Co-operation Act 1958 | No. 6225 | 30 September 1958 |
An Act to consolidate the Law relating to the Formation Registration and Management of Co-operative Societies and for other purposes.
| Co-operative Housing Societies Act 1958 | No. 6226 | 30 September 1958 |
An Act to consolidate the Law relating to the Formation Registration and Management of Co-operative Housing Societies and to the Making by the Treasurer of Victoria of Certain Guarantees and Indemnities in connexion with such Societies, and for other purposes.
| Coroners Act 1958 (repealed) | No. 6227 | 30 September 1958 |
An Act to consolidate the Law relating to Coroners. (Repealed by Coroners Act 1985 (No. 10257))
| Country Fire Authority Act 1958 | No. 6228 | 30 September 1958 |
An Act to consolidate the Law relating to the Country Fire Authority and the Control of Fire in Country Areas.
| Country Roads Act 1958 (repealed) | No. 6229 | 30 September 1958 |
An Act to consolidate the Law relating to Country Roads. (Repealed by Transport Act 1983 (No. 9921))
| County Court Act 1958 | No. 6230 | 30 September 1958 |
An Act to consolidate the Law relating to the County Court.
| Crimes Act 1958 | No. 6231 | 30 September 1958 |
An Act to consolidate the Law relating to Crimes and Criminal Offenders.
| Crown Proceedings Act 1958 | No. 6232 | 30 September 1958 |
An Act to consolidate the Law relating to the Protection and Recovery of Crown Property and to Civil Proceedings by and against the Crown.
| Dairy Products Act 1958 (repealed) | No. 6233 | 30 September 1958 |
An Act to consolidate the Law relating to Dairy Products. (Repealed by Dairy Products (Repeal) Act 1978 (No. 9085))
| Developmental Railways Act 1958 (repealed) | No. 6234 | 30 September 1958 |
An Act to consolidate the Law relating to Developmental Railways in Country Districts. (Repealed by Public Account (Trust Funds) Act 1982 (No. 9861))
| Dietitians Registration Act 1958 | No. 6235 | 30 September 1958 |
An Act to consolidate the Law relating to the Registration of Dietitians and for other purposes.
| Dog Act 1958 (repealed) | No. 6236 | 30 September 1958 |
An Act to consolidate the Law relating to Dogs. (Repealed by Dog Act 1970 (No. 8079))
| Drainage Areas Act 1958 | No. 6237 | 30 September 1958 |
An Act to consolidate the Law relating to the Drainage of Land in Drainage Areas.
| Drainage of Land Act 1958 (repealed) | No. 6238 | 30 September 1958 |
An Act to consolidate the Law relating to the Drainage of Land for Agricultural and other purposes. (Repealed by Drainage of Land Act 1975 (No. 8811))
| Dried Fruits Act 1958 (repealed) | No. 6239 | 30 September 1958 |
An Act to consolidate the Law relating to Dried Fruits and Dried Fruits Packing Houses and for other purposes. (Repealed by Dried Fruits (Repeal) Act 1998 (No. 21 of 1998))
| Education Act 1958 (repealed) | No. 6240 | 30 September 1958 |
An Act to consolidate the Law relating to Education. (Repealed by Education and Training Reform Act 2006 (No. 24 of 2006))
| Electric Light and Power Act 1958 (repealed) | No. 6241 | 30 September 1958 |
An Act to consolidate the Law relating to the Supply of Electricity for Lighting. (Repealed by Electricity Safety Act 1998 (No. 25 of 1998))
| Employers and Employés Act 1958 or the Employers and Employees Act 1958 (repealed) | No. 6242 | 30 September 1958 |
An Act to consolidate the Law relating to Employers and Employés. (Repealed by Employers and Employés (Repeal) Act 1976 (No. 8915))
| Entertainments Tax Act 1958 | No. 6243 | 30 September 1958 |
An Act to consolidate the Law relating to the Imposition of a Tax upon Payments for Admission to Entertainments.
| Essential Services Act 1958 | No. 6244 | 30 September 1958 |
An Act to consolidate the Law making Provision with respect to the Protection of the Community against the Interruption or Dislocation of Essential Services.
| Estate Agents Act 1958 (repealed) | No. 6245 | 30 September 1958 |
An Act to consolidate the Law relating to Estate Agents and Sub-agents. (Repealed by Estate Agents Act 1980 (No. 9428))
| Evidence Act 1958 or the Evidence (Miscellaneous Provisions) Act 1958 | No. 6246 | 30 September 1958 |
An Act to consolidate the Law of Evidence.
| Explosives Act 1958 | No. 6247 | 30 September 1958 |
An Act to consolidate the Law relating to the Importation Carriage Storage Manufacture and Sale of Explosives.
| Farm Produce Agents Act 1958 | No. 6248 | 30 September 1958 |
An Act to consolidate the Law relating to the Licensing of Farm Produce Agents and Purposes incidental thereto.
| Fences Act 1958 | No. 6249 | 30 September 1958 |
An Act to consolidate the Law relating to Dividing and Vermin-proof Fences.
| Fertilizers Act 1958 (repealed) | No. 6250 | 30 September 1958 |
An Act to consolidate the Law relating to the Sale of Fertilizers. (Repealed by Fertilizers Act 1974 (No. 8604))
| Firearms Act 1958 or the Firearms and Other Weapons Act 1958 (repealed) | No. 6251 | 30 September 1958 |
An Act to consolidate the Law relating to Firearms. (Repealed by Firearms Act 1996 (No. 66 of 1996))
| Fisheries Act 1958 (repealed) | No. 6252 | 30 September 1958 |
An Act to consolidate the Law relating to Fisheries. (Repealed by Fisheries Act 1968 (No. 7780))
| Footwear Regulation Act 1958 | No. 6253 | 30 September 1958 |
An Act to consolidate the Law regulating the Manufacture and Sale of Footwear and for other purposes.
| Forests Act 1958 | No. 6254 | 30 September 1958 |
An Act to consolidate the Law for the Management and Protection of State Forests.
| Friendly Societies Act 1958 (repealed) | No. 6255 | 30 September 1958 |
An Act to consolidate the Law relating to Friendly Societies. (Repealed by Friendly Societies Act 1986 (No. 119 of 1986))
| Fruit and Vegetables Act 1958 (repealed) | No. 6256 | 30 September 1958 |
An Act to consolidate the Law relating to Cool Stores for Fruit and the Packing and Sale of Fruit and Vegetables. (Repealed by Plant Health and Plant Products Act 1995 (No. 51 of 1995))
| Fungicides Act 1958 or the Pesticides Act 1958 or the Agricultural Chemicals Act 1958 | No. 6257 | 30 September 1958 |
An Act to consolidate the Law regulating the Sale of Fungicides, Insecticides, Vermin Destroyers, and Weed Destroyers.
| Game Act 1958 (repealed) | No. 6258 | 30 September 1958 |
An Act to consolidate the Law relating to the Protection of Game. (Repealed by Wildlife Act 1975 (No. 8699))
| Gaols Act 1958 | No. 6259 | 30 September 1958 |
An Act to consolidate the Law relating to Gaols.
| Gas and Fuel Corporation Act 1958 | No. 6260 | 30 September 1958 |
An Act to consolidate the Law relating to the Gas and Fuel Corporation of Victoria.
| Gas Regulation Act 1958 | No. 6261 | 30 September 1958 |
An Act to consolidate the Law with respect to the Supply of Gas.
| Geelong Harbor Trust Act 1958 or the Port of Geelong Authority Act 1958 (repealed) | No. 6262 | 30 September 1958 |
An Act to consolidate the Law relating to the Geelong Harbor Trust. (Repealed by Port Services (Amendment) Act 1997 (No. 63 of 1997))
| Geelong Waterworks and Sewerage Act 1958 (repealed) | No. 6263 | 30 September 1958 |
An Act to consolidate the Law relating to Geelong Waterworks and Sewerage. (Repealed by Water Act 1989 (No. 80 of 1989))
| Gold Buyers Act 1958 | No. 6264 | 30 September 1958 |
An Act to consolidate the Law relating to the Purchase Smelting and Treatment of Gold.
| Goods Act 1958 | No. 6265 | 30 September 1958 |
An Act to consolidate the Law relating to Dealings in Goods.
| Grain Elevators Act 1958 (repealed) | No. 6266 | 30 September 1958 |
An Act to consolidate the Law relating to the Handling of Grain in Bulk by Means of the Elevator System. (Repealed by Grain Handling and Storage Act 1995 (No. 45 of 1995))
| Hairdressers Registration Act 1958 (repealed) | No. 6267 | 30 September 1958 |
An Act to consolidate the Law relating to Hairdressers. (Repealed by Hairdressers Registration (Repeal) Act 1985 (No. 10226))
| Harbor Boards Act 1958 or the Harbour Boards Act 1958 (repealed) | No. 6268 | 30 September 1958 |
An Act to consolidate the Law relating to Harbor Boards for Certain Ports. (Repealed by Marine Act 1988 (No. 52 of 1988))
| Hawkers and Pedlers Act 1958 | No. 6269 | 30 September 1958 |
An Act to consolidate the Law relating to Hawkers and Pedlers.
| Health Act 1958 (repealed) | No. 6270 | 30 September 1958 |
An Act to consolidate the Law relating to Public Health. (Repealed by Public Health and Wellbeing Act 2008 (No. 46 of 2008))
| Home Finance Act 1958 | No. 6271 | 30 September 1958 |
An Act to consolidate the Law relating to the Provision of Moneys and the Execution of Guarantees to encourage the Building and Purchase of Dwelling-houses.
| Horse Breeding Act 1958 (repealed) | No. 6272 | 30 September 1958 |
An Act to consolidate the Law regulating the Use of Stallions and Colts for Stud Purposes. (Repealed by Horse Breeding (Repeal) Act 1975 (No. 8773))
| Hospital Benefits Act 1958 | No. 6273 | 30 September 1958 |
An Act to consolidate the Law relating to Hospital Benefits and Certain Hospital Payments.
| Hospitals and Charities Act 1958 (repealed) | No. 6274 | 30 September 1958 |
An Act to consolidate the Law relating to Hospitals and Charities. (Repealed by Health Services Act 1988 (No. 49 of 1988))
| Housing Act 1958 (repealed) | No. 6275 | 30 September 1958 |
An Act to consolidate the Law relating to Housing. (Repealed by Housing Act 1983 (No. 10020))
| Imprisonment of Fraudulent Debtors Act 1958 | No. 6276 | 30 September 1958 |
An Act to consolidate the Law relating to the Imprisonment of Fraudulent Debtors.
| Industrial and Provident Societies Act 1958 (repealed) | No. 6277 | 30 September 1958 |
An Act to consolidate the Law relating to Industrial and Provident Societies. (Repealed by Treasury Legislation (Repeal) Act 2005 (No. 73 of 2005))
| Inebriates Act 1958 (repealed) | No. 6278 | 30 September 1958 |
An Act to consolidate the Law providing for the Care Control and Treatment of Inebriates. (Repealed by Alcoholics and Drug-dependent Persons Act 1968 (No. 7772))
| Instruments Act 1958 | No. 6279 | 30 September 1958 |
An Act to consolidate the Law relating to Instruments and Securities.
| Judicial Proceedings Reports Act 1958 | No. 6280 | 30 September 1958 |
An Act to consolidate the Law regulating the Publication of Reports in relation to Certain Judicial Proceedings.
| Juries Act 1958 | No. 6281 | 30 September 1958 |
An Act to consolidate the Law relating to Juries.
| Justices Act 1958 | No. 6282 | 30 September 1958 |
An Act to consolidate the Law relating to Justices of the Peace and Courts of General and Petty Sessions.
| Labour and Industry Act 1958 (repealed) | No. 6283 | 30 September 1958 |
An Act to consolidate the Law relating to the Ministry of Labour and Industry, Industrial Matters and the Supervision and Regulation of Factories Shops and other Premises. (Repealed by Labour and Industry (Repeal) Act 2008 (No. 62 of 2008))
| Land Act 1958 | No. 6284 | 30 September 1958 |
An Act to consolidate the Law relating to the Sale and Occupation of Crown Lands.
| Landlord and Tenant Act 1958 (repealed) | No. 6285 | 30 September 1958 |
An Act to consolidate the Law relating to Landlord and Tenant. (Repealed by Australian Consumer Law and Fair Trading Act 2012 (No. 21 of 2012))
| Lands Compensation Act 1958 | No. 6286 | 30 September 1958 |
An Act to consolidate the Law relating to the Mode of Procedure in Taking and Determining the Compensation to be paid for Lands required by the State for Public Works.
| Land Settlement Act 1958 | No. 6287 | 30 September 1958 |
An Act to consolidate the Law relating to the Acquisition and Setting Apart of Land for Settlement, the Allocation and Leasing thereof, Advances to Crown Settlers, and the Establishment and Planning of Townships in connexion with the Settlement of Estates.
| Land Surveyors Act 1958 | No. 6288 | 30 September 1958 |
An Act to consolidate the Law relating to Surveyors.
| Land Tax Act 1958 (repealed) | No. 6289 | 30 September 1958 |
An Act to consolidate the Law providing for a Tax on the Unimproved Value of Land and for the Assessment of Land. (Repealed by Land Tax Act 2005 (No. 88 of 2005))
| Latrobe Valley Act 1958 (repealed) | No. 6290 | 30 September 1958 |
An Act to consolidate the Law relating to the Development Water Supply Sewerage and Drainage of the Latrobe Valley and the Prevention of Pollution of the Latrobe River. (Repealed by Water Act 1989 (No. 80 of 1989))
| Legal Profession Practice Act 1958 (repealed) | No. 6291 | 30 September 1958 |
An Act to consolidate the Law relating to the Law Institute of Victoria and regulating the Practice of the Legal Profession. (Repealed by Legal Practice Act 1996 (No. 35 of 1996))
| Libraries Act 1958 (repealed) | No. 6292 | 30 September 1958 |
An Act to consolidate the Law relating to Libraries. (Repealed by Libraries Act 1988 (No. 80 of 1988))
| Licensing Act 1958 | No. 6293 | 30 September 1958 |
An Act to consolidate the Law relating to the Licensing of Public Houses and the Sale of Fermented and Spirituous Liquors.
| Lifts Regulation Act 1958 | No. 6294 | 30 September 1958 |
An Act to consolidate the Law regulating the use of Passenger and other Lifts.
| Limitation of Actions Act 1958 | No. 6295 | 30 September 1958 |
An Act to consolidate the Law relating to the Limitation of Time for commencing Actions and Arbitrations.
| Liquified Petroleum Gas Act 1958 (repealed) | No. 6296 | 30 September 1958 |
An Act to consolidate the Law relating to Liquified Petroleum Gas. (Repealed by Dangerous Goods Act 1985 (No. 10189))
| Livery and Agistment Act 1958 | No. 6297 | 30 September 1958 |
An Act to consolidate the Law for the Better Protection of Livery-stable Keepers and Agisters of Cattle, and for other purposes.
| Local Authorities Superannuation Act 1958 (repealed) | No. 6298 | 30 September 1958 |
An Act to consolidate the Law providing for the Superannuation of Permanent Employés of Municipalities and other Local Authorities. (Repealed by Local Authorities Superannuation Act 1988 (No. 23 of 1988))
| Local Government Act 1958 | No. 6299 | 30 September 1958 |
An Act to consolidate the Law relating to Local Government.
| Maintenance Act 1958 (repealed) | No. 6300 | 30 September 1958 |
An Act to consolidate the Law relating to the Maintenance of Wives and Children and relating to Confinement Expenses and relating to the Relief of Persons whose Relatives liable to support Them reside in another State or a Territory of the Commonwealth or in the Dominion of New Zealand, and to facilitate the Enforcement in Victoria of Maintenance Orders made in England and Northern Ireland and other Parts of Her Majesty's Dominions and Protectorates and in other Countries and vice versa. (Repealed by Maintenance Act 1965 (No. 7289))
| Margarine Act 1958 | No. 6301 | 30 September 1958 |
An Act to consolidate the Law relating to the Manufacture Packing and Sale of Margarine.
| Marine Act 1958 (repealed) | No. 6302 | 30 September 1958 |
An Act to consolidate the Law relating to Passengers Harbors and Navigation. (Repealed by Marine Act 1988 (No. 52 of 1988))
| Marine Stores and Old Metals Act 1958 (repealed) | No. 6303 | 30 September 1958 |
An Act to consolidate the Law relating to Collectors of and Dealers in Special Wares Marine Stores and Old Metals. (Repealed by Second-Hand Dealers and Pawnbrokers Act 1989 (No. 54 of 1989))
| Marketing of Primary Products Act 1958 | No. 6304 | 30 September 1958 |
An Act to consolidate the Law relating to the Marketing of Certain Classes of Products.
| Markets Act 1958 | No. 6305 | 30 September 1958 |
An Act to consolidate the Law relating to Markets.
| Marriage Act 1958 | No. 6306 | 30 September 1958 |
An Act to consolidate the Law relating to Marriage and to Divorce and Matrimonial Causes and to Guardianship and Custody of Infants.
| Masseurs Act 1958 | No. 6307 | 30 September 1958 |
An Act to consolidate the Law making Provision with respect to the Training Qualifications and Registration of Masseurs and the Practice of Massage.
| Master and Apprentice Act 1958 | No. 6308 | 30 September 1958 |
An Act to consolidate the Law relating to Masters and Apprentices.
| Medical Act 1958 | No. 6309 | 30 September 1958 |
An Act to consolidate the Law relating to Medical Practitioners Dentists and Chemists and to the Adoption of the British Pharmacopœia.
| Melbourne and Metropolitan Board of Works Act 1958 (repealed) | No. 6310 | 30 September 1958 |
An Act to consolidate the Law relating to the Melbourne and Metropolitan Board of Works. (Repealed by Water (Governance) Act 2006 (No. 85 of 2006))
| Melbourne and Metropolitan Tramways Act 1958 (repealed) | No. 6311 | 30 September 1958 |
An Act to consolidate the Law relating to Metropolitan Tramways. (Repealed by Transport Act 1983 (No. 9921))
| Melbourne Harbor Trust Act 1958 or the Port of Melbourne Authority Act 1958 (repealed) | No. 6312 | 30 September 1958 |
An Act to consolidate the Law providing for the Regulation Management and Improvement of the Port of Melbourne and certain Portions of the River Yarra Yarra and certain Portions of the Maribyrnong River and for other purposes connected therewith. (Repealed by Port Services (Amendment) Act 1997 (No. 63 of 1997))
| Mental Deficiency Act 1958 (repealed) | No. 6313 | 30 September 1958 |
An Act to consolidate the Law relating to the Care of Mentally Defective Persons and Mentally Retarded Children. (Repealed by Mental Health Act 1959 (No. 6605))
| Mental Hygiene Act 1958 (repealed) | No. 6314 | 30 September 1958 |
An Act to consolidate the Law relating to Mental Hygiene. (Repealed by Mental Health Act 1959 (No. 6605))
| Metropolitan Fire Brigades Act 1958 or the Fire Rescue Victoria Act 1958 | No. 6315 | 30 September 1958 |
An Act to consolidate the Law relating to the Protection of Life and Property from Fire in the Metropolitan Fire District.
| Mildura Irrigation and Water Trusts Act 1958 or the Mildura Irrigation Trusts and Sunraysia Water Board Act 1958 | No. 6316 | 30 September 1958 |
An Act to consolidate the Law relating to Irrigation and Water Trusts within the Irrigation Settlement of Mildura.
| Milk and Dairy Supervision Act 1958 (repealed) | No. 6317 | 30 September 1958 |
An Act to consolidate the Law regulating the Production Testing Grading and Sale of Milk and Dairy Produce and the Manufacture of Dairy Produce. (Repealed by Dairy Industry Act 1984 (No. 10171))
| Milk Board Act 1958 (repealed) | No. 6318 | 30 September 1958 |
An Act to consolidate the Law relating to the Milk Board and the Powers and Duties thereof. (Repealed by Dairy Industry Act 1984 (No. 10171))
| Milk Pasteurization Act 1958 (repealed) | No. 6319 | 30 September 1958 |
An Act to consolidate the Law relating to the Pasteurization of Milk. (Repealed by Dairy Industry Act 1984 (No. 10171))
| Mines Act 1958 (repealed) | No. 6320 | 30 September 1958 |
An Act to consolidate the Law relating to Mines. (Repealed by Energy and Resources Legislation Amendment Act 2010 (No. 55 of 2010))
| Mining Development Act 1958 | No. 6321 | 30 September 1958 |
An Act to consolidate the Law relating to Mining Development.
| Ministry of Transport Act 1958 (repealed) | No. 6322 | 30 September 1958 |
An Act to consolidate the Law relating to the Ministry of Transport and to the Co-ordination of Transport in Victoria. (Repealed by Transport Act 1983 (No. 9921))
| Mint Act 1958 (repealed) | No. 6323 | 30 September 1958 |
An Act to consolidate the Law relating to the Maintenance in Victoria of a Branch of the Royal Mint. (Repealed by Treasury Legislation (Repeal) Act 2005 (No. 73 of 2005))
| Money Lenders Act 1958 | No. 6324 | 30 September 1958 |
An Act to consolidate the Law relating to Money Lenders and Money-lending Transactions.
| Motor Car Act 1958 (repealed) | No. 6325 | 30 September 1958 |
An Act to consolidate the Law relating to Motor Cars. (Repealed by Road Safety Act 1986 (No. 127 of 1986))
| National Parks Act 1958 | No. 6326 | 30 September 1958 |
An Act to consolidate the Law relating to National Parks.
| Newmarket Sheep Sales Act 1958 | No. 6327 | 30 September 1958 |
An Act to consolidate the Law relating to the Regulation of the Sale of Sheep at the Newmarket Saleyards in the City of Melbourne.
| Nurses Act 1958 (repealed) | No. 6328 | 30 September 1958 |
An Act to consolidate the Law relating to the Nursing Profession. (Repealed by Nurses Act 1993 (No. 111 of 1993))
| Opticians Registration Act 1958 | No. 6329 | 30 September 1958 |
An Act to consolidate the Law relating to Opticians and the Practice of Optometry.
| Partnership Act 1958 | No. 6330 | 30 September 1958 |
An Act to consolidate the Law relating to Partnership.
| Patriotic Funds Act 1958 (repealed) | No. 6331 | 30 September 1958 |
An Act to consolidate the Law relating to the Regulation and Control of the Raising Collection and Application of Patriotic Funds. (Repealed by Veterans Act 2005 (No. 98 of 2005))
| Pawnbrokers Act 1958 (repealed) | No. 6332 | 30 September 1958 |
An Act to consolidate the Law relating to Pawnbrokers. (Repealed by Second-Hand Dealers and Pawnbrokers Act 1989 (No. 54 of 1989))
| Penalties Act 1958 (repealed) | No. 6333 | 30 September 1958 |
An Act to consolidate the Law relating to Penalties. (Repealed by Penalties and Sentences Act 1981 (No. 9554))
| Petroleum Act 1958 (repealed) | No. 6334 | 30 September 1958 |
An Act to consolidate the Law relating to the Encouragement and Regulation of Exploring Prospecting and Mining for Petroleum. (Repealed by Petroleum Act 1998 (No. 96 of 1998))
| Petrol Pumps Act 1958 | No. 6335 | 30 September 1958 |
An Act to consolidate the Law relating to Petrol Pumps.
| Poisons Act 1958 | No. 6336 | 30 September 1958 |
An Act to consolidate the Law relating to the Sale and Use of Poisons and Poisonous and Narcotic Substances and Preparations and Potent Drugs.
| Police Offences Act 1958 | No. 6337 | 30 September 1958 |
An Act to consolidate the Law relating to Police Offences.
| Police Regulation Act 1958 or the Police Regulation (Pensions) Act 1958 | No. 6338 | 30 September 1958 |
An Act to consolidate the Law relating to the Police Force in Victoria.
| Poor Persons Legal Assistance Act 1958 | No. 6339 | 30 September 1958 |
An Act to consolidate the Law relating to the Provision of Legal Assistance to Poor Persons.
| Portland Harbor Trust Act 1958 or the Port of Portland Authority Act 1958 (repealed) | No. 6340 | 30 September 1958 |
An Act to consolidate the Law relating to Portland Harbor. (Repealed by Port Services (Amendment) Act 1997 (No. 63 of 1997))
| Pounds Act 1958 | No. 6341 | 30 September 1958 |
An Act to consolidate the Law relating to the Impounding of Cattle.
| Printers and Newspapers Act 1958 (repealed) | No. 6342 | 30 September 1958 |
An Act to consolidate the Law relating to the Prevention of the Printing and Publishing of Books and Papers by Persons not known and to the Printing and Publishing of Newspapers. (Repealed by Printers and Newspapers (Repeal) Act 1998 (No. 56 of 1998))
| Process Servers and Inquiry Agents Act 1958 | No. 6343 | 30 September 1958 |
An Act to consolidate the Law relating to Process Servers and Inquiry Agents.
| Property Law Act 1958 | No. 6344 | 30 September 1958 |
An Act to consolidate the Law relating to Conveyancing and the Law of Property.
| Public Account Act 1958 (repealed) | No. 6345 | 30 September 1958 |
An Act to consolidate the Law relating to the Public Account. (Repealed by Financial Management Act 1994 (No. 18 of 1994))
| Public Authorities Marks Act 1958 (repealed) | No. 6346 | 30 September 1958 |
An Act to consolidate the Law relating to the Testing and the Stamping or Marking or Use of Articles Materials or Things for or in connexion with the Works of certain Public Authorities. (Repealed by Local Government (Miscellaneous Amendment) Act 1997 (No. 76 of 1997))
| Public Contracts Act 1958 (repealed) | No. 6347 | 30 September 1958 |
An Act to consolidate the Law relating to the Purchase of Goods Machinery or Materials for Works undertaken by or on behalf of certain Local Authorities. (Repealed by Public Contracts (Repeal) Act 1986 (No. 21 of 1986))
| Public Safety Preservation Act 1958 | No. 6348 | 30 September 1958 |
An Act to consolidate the Law making Provisions for the Protection of the Community in Cases of Emergency.
| Public Service Act 1958 (repealed) | No. 6349 | 30 September 1958 |
An Act to consolidate the Law relating to the Public Service of Victoria. (Repealed by Public Service Act 1974 (No. 8658))
| Public Trustee Act 1958 | No. 6350 | 30 September 1958 |
An Act to consolidate the Law relating to the Public Trustee.
| Public Works Act 1958 | No. 6351 | 30 September 1958 |
An Act to consolidate the Law relating to Public Works.
| Public Works Committee Act 1958 (repealed) | No. 6352 | 30 September 1958 |
An Act to consolidate the Law making Provision for the Appointment and Constitution of a Public Works Committee and the Powers and Duties thereof. (Repealed by Parliamentary Committees (Joint Investigatory Committees) Act 1982 (No. 9765))
| Racing Act 1958 | No. 6353 | 30 September 1958 |
An Act to consolidate the Law relating to Horse Pony Trotting and Dog Racing, the Registration of Bookmakers and their Clerks, and Totalizators.
| Railway Lands Acquisition Act 1958 (repealed) | No. 6354 | 30 September 1958 |
An Act to consolidate the Law relating to the Acquisition of Lands required for the Construction of Lines of Railway. (Repealed by Transport Act 1983 (No. 9921))
| Railways Act 1958 (repealed) | No. 6355 | 30 September 1958 |
An Act to consolidate the Law relating to Railways. (Repealed by Transport Act 1983 (No. 9921))
| Registration of Births Deaths and Marriages Act 1958 (repealed) | No. 6356 | 30 September 1958 |
An Act to consolidate the Law relating to the Registration of Births Deaths and Marriages. (Repealed by Registration of Births Deaths and Marriages Act 1959 (No. 6564))
| Religious Successory and Charitable Trusts Act 1958 or the Religious and Successory Trusts Act 1958 | No. 6357 | 30 September 1958 |
An Act to consolidate the Law relating to Religious Successory and Charitable Trusts.
| River Improvement Act 1958 (repealed) | No. 6358 | 30 September 1958 |
An Act to consolidate the Law relating to River Improvement and Drainage. (Repealed by Water Act 1989 (No. 80 of 1989))
| Road Traffic Act 1958 (repealed) | No. 6359 | 30 September 1958 |
An Act to consolidate the Law relating to the Control of Traffic on Roads and Prosecutions for Parking and Traffic Infringements. (Repealed by Transport Act 1983 (No. 9921))
| Rural Finance Corporation Act 1958 or the Rural Finance Act 1958 (repealed) | No. 6360 | 30 September 1958 |
An Act to consolidate the Law relating to the Rural Finance Corporation and the Objects Constitution Functions Powers and Management thereof. (Repealed by Rural Finance Act 1988 (No. 44 of 1988))
| Sale of Allotments of Land Act 1958 | No. 6361 | 30 September 1958 |
An Act to consolidate the Law relating to the Sale of Allotments of Land.
| Seamen's Act 1958 | No. 6362 | 30 September 1958 |
An Act to consolidate the Law relating to Seamen.
| Second-hand Dealers Act 1958 (repealed) | No. 6363 | 30 September 1958 |
An Act to consolidate the Law regulating the Sale and Purchase of Goods by Second-hand Dealers. (Repealed by Second-Hand Dealers and Pawnbrokers Act 1989 (No. 54 of 1989))
| Seeds Act 1958 | No. 6364 | 30 September 1958 |
An Act to consolidate the Law relating to Seeds.
| Senate Elections Act 1958 | No. 6365 | 30 September 1958 |
An Act to consolidate the Law relating to the Election of Senators for Victoria to the Senate of the Commonwealth.
| Servants' Registry Offices Act 1958 | No. 6366 | 30 September 1958 |
An Act to consolidate the Law relating to the Regulation of Servants' Registry Offices.
| Settled Land Act 1958 | No. 6367 | 30 September 1958 |
An Act to consolidate the Law relating to Settled Land.
| Sewerage Districts Act 1958 (repealed) | No. 6368 | 30 September 1958 |
An Act to consolidate the Law relating to Sewerage Districts and the Sewering thereof. (Repealed by Water Act 1989 (No. 80 of 1989))
| Shearers Accommodation Act 1958 | No. 6369 | 30 September 1958 |
An Act to consolidate the Law relating to Shearers Accommodation.
| Sheep Dipping Act 1958 (repealed) | No. 6370 | 30 September 1958 |
An Act to consolidate the Law relating to the Compulsory Dipping of Sheep. (Repealed by Sheep Dipping (Repeal) Act 1966 (No. 7398))
| Sheep Owners Protection Act 1958 | No. 6371 | 30 September 1958 |
An Act to consolidate the Law regulating the Carriage of Sheep by Motor Car and the Sale of Raw Sheep Skins.
| Soil Conservation and Land Utilization Act 1958 (repealed) | No. 6372 | 30 September 1958 |
An Act to consolidate the Law relating to Soil Conservation and Land Utilization. (Repealed by Catchment and Land Protection Act 1994 (No. 52 of 1994))
| Soldier Settlement Act 1958 (repealed) | No. 6373 | 30 September 1958 |
An Act to consolidate the Law relating to Soldier Settlement. (Repealed by Rural Finance Act 1988 (No. 44 of 1988))
| Solicitor-General Act 1958 (repealed) | No. 6374 | 30 September 1958 |
An Act to consolidate the Law relating to the Office of Solicitor-General. (Repealed by Attorney-General and Solicitor-General Act 1972 (No. 8305))
| Stamps Act 1958 (repealed) | No. 6375 | 30 September 1958 |
An Act to consolidate the Law relating to Stamps. (Repealed by Duties Act 2000 (No. 79 of 2000))
| State Development Act 1958 or the State Development Committee Act 1958 (repealed) | No. 6376 | 30 September 1958 |
An Act to consolidate the Law relating to the Appointment and Constitution of a State Development Committee and the Functions thereof. (Repealed by Parliamentary Committees (Joint Investigatory Committees) Act 1982 (No. 9765))
| State Electricity Commission Act 1958 or the Former SEC (Residual Provisions) Act 1958 | No. 6377 | 30 September 1958 |
An Act to consolidate and amend the Law relating to the State Electricity Commission of Victoria and the Powers and Duties thereof.
| State Relief Committee Act 1958 or the Victorian Relief Committee Act 1958 (repealed) | No. 6378 | 30 September 1958 |
An Act to consolidate the Law relating to the Constitution and Powers of the State Relief Committee. (Repealed by Legislation Reform (Repeals No. 1) Act 2008 (No. 10 of 2008))
| State Savings Bank Act 1958 or the State Bank Act 1958 (repealed) | No. 6379 | 30 September 1958 |
An Act to consolidate the Law relating to the State Savings Bank of Victoria. (Repealed by State Bank Act 1988 (No. 29 of 1988))
| Statistics Act 1958 (repealed) | No. 6380 | 30 September 1958 |
An Act to consolidate the Law relating to the Government Statist and Statistics. (Repealed by Treasury Legislation (Repeal) Act 2005 (No. 73 of 2005))
| Stock and Share Brokers Act 1958 | No. 6381 | 30 September 1958 |
An Act to consolidate the Law with respect to the Keeping of Certain Books Accounts and Records by Members of Stock Exchanges and the Examination and Audit thereof.
| Stock Diseases Act 1958 | No. 6382 | 30 September 1958 |
An Act to consolidate the Law relating to Diseases in Stock.
| Stock Foods Act 1958 (repealed) | No. 6383 | 30 September 1958 |
An Act to consolidate the Law regulating the Sale of Chaff and other Foods for Stock. (Repealed by Animal Preparations Act 1987 (No. 12 of 1987))
| Stock Medicines Act 1958 (repealed) | No. 6384 | 30 September 1958 |
An Act to consolidate the Law relating to the Registration of Stock Medicines and the Regulation of the Sale thereof. (Repealed by Animal Preparations Act 1987 (No. 12 of 1987))
| Street Trading Act 1958 | No. 6385 | 30 September 1958 |
An Act to consolidate the Law regulating Street Trading in Certain Cases.
| Superannuation Act 1958 (repealed) | No. 6386 | 30 September 1958 |
An Act to consolidate the Law making Provision on a Contributory Basis for Superannuation Benefits for certain Public Officers and Employés and Benefits for Certain of their Dependants. (Repealed by State Superannuation Act 1988 (No. 50 of 1988))
| Supreme Court Act 1958 (repealed) | No. 6387 | 30 September 1958 |
An Act to consolidate the Law relating to the Supreme Court. (Repealed by Supreme Court Act 1986 (No. 110 of 1986))
| Survey Co-ordination Act 1958 | No. 6388 | 30 September 1958 |
An Act to consolidate the Law with respect to the Co-ordination of Surveys in Victoria and the Facilitation of Co-operation with the Commonwealth of Australia in relation to a National Mapping Scheme.
| Swine Act 1958 | No. 6389 | 30 September 1958 |
An Act to consolidate the Law relating to Compensation for the Owners of Pigs in Certain Cases and to prohibit the Making of Certain Charges or Deductions in connexion with the Sale of Swine.
| Tattersall Consultations Act 1958 (repealed) | No. 6390 | 30 September 1958 |
An Act to consolidate the Law providing for the Promotion in Victoria and the Conduct of Sweepstakes known as Tattersall Sweep Consultation Care of George Adams. (Repealed by Public Lotteries Act 2000 (No. 73 of 2000))
| Teaching Service Act 1958 | No. 6391 | 30 September 1958 |
An Act to consolidate the Law relating to the Teaching Service in the Education Department.
| Temperance Halls Act 1958 | No. 6392 | 30 September 1958 |
An Act to consolidate the Law relating to the Demise of Certain Lands and Buildings by the Trustees of Temperance Halls and the Raising of Certain Loans by such Trustees.
| Theatres Act 1958 (repealed) | No. 6393 | 30 September 1958 |
An Act to consolidate the Law relating to Theatres and Censorship of Cinematograph Films. (Repealed by Theatres (Repeal) Act 2002 (No. 21 of 2002))
| Tobacco Sellers Act 1958 | No. 6394 | 30 September 1958 |
An Act to consolidate the Law relating to Sellers or Tobacco Cigars Cigarettes and Snuff.
| Tourist Act 1958 | No. 6395 | 30 September 1958 |
An Act to consolidate the Law relating to the Development of Tourist Resorts and the Tourist Industry in Victoria.
| Town and Country Planning Act 1958 | No. 6396 | 30 September 1958 |
An Act to consolidate the Law relating to Town and Country Planning.
| Trade Unions Act 1958 | No. 6397 | 30 September 1958 |
An Act to consolidate the Law relating to Trade Unions.
| Tramways Act 1958 | No. 6398 | 30 September 1958 |
An Act to consolidate the Law relating to Tramways.
| Transfer of Land Act 1958 | No. 6399 | 30 September 1958 |
An Act to consolidate the Law relating to the Simplification of the Title to and the Dealing with Estates and Interests in Land.
| Transport Regulation Act 1958 (repealed) | No. 6400 | 30 September 1958 |
An Act to consolidate the Law relating to the Transport Regulation Board and Commercial Passenger Vehicles. (Repealed by Transport Act 1983 (No. 9921))
| Trustee Act 1958 | No. 6401 | 30 September 1958 |
An Act to consolidate the Law relating to Trustees.
| Trustee Companies Act 1958 (repealed) | No. 6402 | 30 September 1958 |
An Act to consolidate the Law relating to Trustee Companies. (Repealed by Trustee Companies Act 1984 (No. 10168))
| Unauthorized Documents Act 1958 | No. 6403 | 30 September 1958 |
An Act to consolidate the Law relating to the Unauthorized Use of the Royal or other Arms and to the Issue of False or Misleading Process and other Documents.
| Unclaimed Moneys Act 1958 | No. 6404 | 30 September 1958 |
An Act to consolidate the Law providing for the Payment into the Consolidated Revenue of Unclaimed Moneys in Court.
| University Act 1958 or the Melbourne University Act 1958 (repealed) | No. 6405 | 30 September 1958 |
An Act to consolidate the Law relating to the University of Melbourne. (Repealed by University of Melbourne Act 2009 (No. 78 of 2009))
| Unlawful Assemblies and Processions Act 1958 | No. 6406 | 30 September 1958 |
An Act to consolidate the Law relating to Unlawful Assemblies and Processions Special Constables and Riotously Disturbed Districts.
| Vegetation and Vine Diseases Act 1958 (repealed) | No. 6407 | 30 September 1958 |
An Act to consolidate the Law relating to Diseases of Vegetation and Vines. (Repealed by Plant Health and Plant Products Act 1995 (No. 51 of 1995))
| Venereal Diseases Act 1958 | No. 6408 | 30 September 1958 |
An Act to consolidate the Law relating to Venereal Diseases.
| Vermin and Noxious Weeds Act 1958 (repealed) | No. 6409 | 30 September 1958 |
An Act to consolidate the Law relating to Vermin and Noxious Weeds. (Repealed by Catchment and Land Protection Act 1994 (No. 52 of 1994))
| Veterinary Surgeons Act 1958 (repealed) | No. 6410 | 30 September 1958 |
An Act to consolidate the Law relating to Veterinary Surgeons. (Repealed by Veterinary Practice Act 1997 (No. 58 of 1997))
| Victorian Inland Meat Authority Act 1958 (repealed) | No. 6411 | 30 September 1958 |
An Act to consolidate the Law relating to the Victorian Inland Meat Authority. (Repealed by Victorian Inland Meat Authority Act 1974 (No. 8572)
| Warehousemen's Liens Act 1958 | No. 6412 | 30 September 1958 |
An Act to consolidate the Law relating to the Warehousing of Goods.
| Water Act 1958 (repealed) | No. 6413 | 30 September 1958 |
An Act to consolidate the Law relating to the Conservation and Supply of Water and the Law relating to Certain Rights in Natural Waters and the Property in the Beds and Banks containing the Same. (Repealed by Water Act 1989 (No. 80 of 1989))
| Weights and Measures Act 1958 (repealed) | No. 6414 | 30 September 1958 |
An Act to consolidate the Law relating to Weights and Measures. (Repealed by Trade Measurement (Administration) Act 1995 (No. 60 of 1995))
| Wild Flowers and Native Plants Protection Act 1958 | No. 6415 | 30 September 1958 |
An Act to consolidate the Law relating to the Protection of Wild Flowers and Native Plants.
| Wills Act 1958 (repealed) | No. 6416 | 30 September 1958 |
An Act to consolidate the Law relating to Wills. (Repealed by Wills Act 1997 (No. 88 of 1997))
| Wire Netting Act 1958 (repealed) | No. 6417 | 30 September 1958 |
An Act to consolidate the Law relating to the Supplying of Wire Netting. (Repealed by Statute Law Revision Act 1995 (No. 11 of 1995))
| Women's Qualification Act 1958 | No. 6418 | 30 September 1958 |
An Act to consolidate the Law with respect to Disqualifications on Account of Sex.
| Workers Compensation Act 1958 | No. 6419 | 30 September 1958 |
An Act to consolidate the Law relating to Compensation to Workers for Injuries arising out of or in the Course of their Employment.
| Wrongs Act 1958 | No. 6420 | 30 September 1958 |
An Act to consolidate the Law relating to Wrongs.
| Youth Organizations Assistance Act 1958 | No. 6421 | 30 September 1958 |
An Act to consolidate the Law providing for Assistance for Youth Organizations.
| Amendments Incorporation Act 1958 | No. 6422 | 30 September 1958 |
An Act for the Incorporation of Amendments in Reprints of Amended Acts.
| Police Offences (Trespass to Farms) Act 1958 (repealed) | No. 6423 | 8 October 1958 |
An Act relating to the Application of Division 7 of Part VII. of the Police Offences Act 1958. (Note: Police Offences Act 1958 (No. 6337)) (Repealed by Statute Law Revision (Repeals) Act 1982 (No. 9863))
| Fern Tree Gully and Gembrook Railway (Reconstruction) Amendment Act 1958 (repealed) | No. 6424 | 8 October 1958 |
An Act to amend the Fern Tree Gully and Gembrook Railway (Reconstruction) Act 1948 (Note: Fern Tree Gully and Gembrook Railway (Reconstruction) Act 1948 (No. 5355)) with respect to Compensation in respect of Lands Acquired or Prejudicially Affected, and for other purposes. (Repealed by Statute Law Revision (Repeals) Act 1982 (No. 9863))
| Kew and Heidelberg Lands Act 1958 (repealed) | No. 6425 | 8 October 1958 |
An Act to provide for the Addition of certain Lands to the Lands reserved for a Public Park and Recreation in the Cities of Kew and Heidelberg, and for other purposes. (Repealed by Land (Revocation of Reservations and Other Matters) 2009 (No. 81 of 2009))
| Gas and Fuel Corporation (Maryborough Undertaking) Act 1958 (repealed) | No. 6426 | 8 October 1958 |
An Act to approve validate and ratify the Terms of Acquisition by the Gas and Fuel Corporation of Victoria of the Assets Property and Goodwill of the Gas Undertaking and Business of the Maryborough Gas Company Limited. (Repealed by Statute Law Revision (Repeals) Act 1982 (No. 9863))
| Local Government (Dandenong) Act 1958 (repealed) | No. 6427 | 8 October 1958 |
An Act to enable the Governor in Council to declare the Shire of Dandenong a City. (Repealed by Statute Law Revision (Repeals) Act 1982 (No. 9863))
| Responsible Ministers Act 1958 or the Responsible Ministers of the Crown Act 1958 (repealed) | No. 6428 | 14 October 1958 |
An Act relating to Responsible Ministers of the Crown. (Repealed by Statute Law Revision (Repeals) Act 1982 (No. 9863))
| Supreme Court and County Court (Judges) Act 1958 (repealed) | No. 6429 | 14 October 1958 |
An Act to make Provision for Increasing the Number of Judges of the Supreme Court and of the County Court. (Repealed by Statute Law Revision (Repeals) Act 1982 (No. 9863))
| Melbourne and Metropolitan Board of Works (Borrowing Powers and Debentures) Act 1958 (repealed) | No. 6430 | 21 October 1958 |
An Act to increase the Borrowing Powers of the Melbourne and Metropolitan Board of Works, and for other purposes. (Repealed by Statute Law Revision (Repeals) Act 1982 (No. 9863))
| | No. 6431 | 28 October 1958 |
An Act to apply out of the Consolidated Revenue the sum of Two million three hundred and forty-three thousand eight hundred and nineteen pounds to the service of the year One thousand nine hundred and fifty-seven and One thousand nine hundred and fifty-eight. (Repealed by Statute Law Revision (Repeals) Act 1982 (No. 9863))
| Fences (Amendment) Act 1958 | No. 6432 | 28 October 1958 |
An Act to amend Sections Three and Thirty of the Fences Act 1928. (Note: Fences Act 1928 (19 Geo. V. No. 3679); this was amended by the Sessional Acts Revision Act 1958 (No. 6489) to a reference to the Fences Act 1958 (No. 6249))
| Contracts of Sale (Payments) Act 1958 (repealed) | No. 6433 | 28 October 1958 |
An Act relating to Payments by Cheque under Contracts for the Sale of Land. (Repealed by Statute Law Revision (Repeals) Act 1982 (No. 9863))
| Metropolitan Fire Brigades (Board) Act 1958 (repealed) | No. 6434 | 28 October 1958 |
An Act to re-enact Section Five and to amend Section Seven of the Metropolitan Fire Brigades Act 1958. (Note: Metropolitan Fire Brigades Act 1958 (No. 6315)) (Repealed by Statute Law Revision (Repeals) Act 1982 (No. 9863))
| Process Servers and Inquiry Agents (Repossessions) Act 1958 (repealed) | No. 6435 | 28 October 1958 |
An Act to provide for the Registration of Hire-Purchase Repossession Agents. (Repealed by Statute Law Revision (Repeals) Act 1982 (No. 9863))
| Housing (Broadmeadows Land) Act 1958 (repealed) | No. 6436 | 29 October 1958 |
An Act relating to certain Land owned by the Housing Commission in the City of Broadmeadows. (Repealed by Statute Law Revision (Repeals) Act 1982 (No. 9863))
| | No. 6437 | 29 October 1958 |
An Act to apply out of the Consolidated Revenue the sum of Nineteen million seven hundred and seventy-eight thousand five hundred and ninety-two pounds to the service of the year One thousand nine hundred and fifty-eight and One thousand nine hundred and fifty-nine. (Repealed by Statute Law Revision (Repeals) Act 1982 (No. 9863))
| Instruments (Bills of Sale) Act 1958 (repealed) | No. 6438 | 5 November 1958 |
An Act to amend Part VI. of the Instruments Act 1958. (Note: Instruments Act 1958 (No. 6279)) (Repealed by Statute Law Revision (Repeals) Act 1982 (No. 9863))
| Churches of Christ, Scientist Incorporation Act 1958 | No. 6439 | 5 November 1958 |
An Act to incorporate First Church of Christ, Scientist, Melbourne and to provide for the Incorporation of other Churches of Christ, Scientist, in the State of Victoria and for other purposes.
| Wheat Industry Stabilization Act 1958 | No. 6440 | 11 November 1958 |
An Act relating to the Stabilization of the Wheat Industry.
| Dog (Guides for the Blind) Act 1958 | No. 6441 | 11 November 1958 |
An Act to make Provision with respect to the Use of Guide Dogs by the Blind.
| Monash University (Acquisition of Land) Act 1958 (repealed) | No. 6442 | 13 November 1958 |
An Act to amend Section Thirty-four of the Monash University Act 1958. (Note: Monash University Act 1958 (No. 6184)) (Repealed by Statute Law Revision (Repeals) Act 1982 (No. 9863))
| Soldier Settlement (Loan) Act 1958 (repealed) | No. 6443 | 18 November 1958 |
An Act to amend Section Eighteen of the Soldier Settlement Act 1945. (Note: Soldier Settlement Act 1945 (No. 5107); this was amended by the Sessional Acts Revision Act 1958 (No. 6489) to a reference to the Soldier Settlement Act 1958 (No. 6373)) (Repealed by Statute Law Revision (Repeals) Act 1982 (No. 9863))
| Home Finance (Amendment) Act 1958 | No. 6444 | 18 November 1958 |
An Act to amend the Home Finance Act 1958. (Note: Home Finance Act 1958 (No. 6271))
| Friendly Societies (Amendment) Act 1958 (repealed) | No. 6445 | 18 November 1958 |
An Act to amend the Friendly Societies Act 1928. (Note: Friendly Societies Act 1928 (19 Geo. V. No. 3686); this was amended by the Sessional Acts Revision Act 1958 (No. 6489) to a reference to the Friendly Societies Act 1958 (No. 6255).) (Repealed by Statute Law Revision (Repeals) Act 1982 (No. 9863))
| Co-operative Housing Societies (Guarantees) Act 1958 (repealed) | No. 6446 | 18 November 1958 |
An Act to amend Section Seventy-five of the Co-operative Housing Societies Act 1957. (Note: Co-operative Housing Societies Act 1957 (No. 6138); this was amended by the Sessional Acts Revision Act 1958 (No. 6489) to a reference to the Co-operative Housing Societies Act 1958 (No. 6226)) (Repealed by Statute Law Revision (Repeals) Act 1982 (No. 9863))
| Land Tax (Exemptions and Rates) Act 1958 (repealed) | No. 6447 | 18 November 1958 |
An Act to amend Sections Seven and Ninety-six of the Land Tax Act 1928 (Note: Land Tax Act 1928 (19 Geo. V. No. 3713); this was amended by the Sessional Acts Revision Act 1958 (No. 6489) to a reference to the Land Tax Act 1958 (No. 6289)) and to declare the Rate of Land Tax for the Year ending the Thirty-first day of December One thousand nine hundred and fifty-nine. (Repealed by Statute Law Revision (Repeals) Act 1982 (No. 9863))
| River Murray Waters Act 1958 (repealed) | No. 6448 | 18 November 1958 |
An Act to ratify and approve an Agreement for the further Variation of the Agreement entered into between the Prime Minister of the Commonwealth and the Premiers of the States of New South Wales, Victoria and South Australia respecting the River Murray and Lake Victoria and other Waters, and for other purposes. (Repealed by Statute Law Revision (Repeals) Act 1982 (No. 9863))
| Victorian Inland Meat Authority (Advances) Act 1958 (repealed) | No. 6449 | 18 November 1958 |
An Act to further amend Section Nineteen of the Victorian Inland Meat Authority Act 1942. (Note: Victorian Inland Meat Authority Act 1942 (No. 4927); this was amended by the Sessional Acts Revision Act 1958 (No. 6489) to a reference to the Victorian Inland Meat Authority Act 1958 (No. 6411)) (Repealed by Victorian Inland Meat Authority Act 1974 (No. 8572)
| Stamps (Amendment) Act 1958 (repealed) | No. 6450 | 25 November 1958 |
An Act relating to Stamp Duty. (Repealed by Statute Law Revision (Repeals) Act 1982 (No. 9863))
| Superannuation (Amendment) Act 1958 (repealed) | No. 6451 | 25 November 1958 |
An Act to amend the Superannuation Acts. (Repealed by Statute Law Revision (Repeals) Act 1982 (No. 9863))
| Grain Elevators (Amendment) Act 1958 (repealed) | No. 6452 | 25 November 1958 |
An Act to amend Sub-section (4) of Section Forty-three of the Grain Elevators Act 1934. (Note: Grain Elevators Act 1934 (No. 4270); this was amended by the Sessional Acts Revision Act 1958 (No. 6489) to a reference to the Grain Elevators Act 1958 (No. 6266)) (Repealed by Statute Law Revision (Repeals) Act 1982 (No. 9863))
| Geelong Harbor Trust Lands Act 1958 (repealed) | No. 6453 | 25 November 1958 |
An Act to divest certain Lands from the Geelong Harbor Trust Commissioners, to provide for the Grant of Portions thereof to the Minister of Education, the President Councillors and Ratepayers of the Shire of Corio, the State Electricity Commission of Victoria and the Grain Elevators Board, for the Reservation of a Portion thereof as a Site for Recreation and Public Purposes, and for the Proclamation of Portion thereof as a Road, to revoke the Permanent Reservation of certain Land in the Parish of Moorpanyal and to provide for the Grant thereof to the Grain Elevators Board, to provide for the Proclamation of certain Land comprised in the Eighth Schedule to the Geelong Harbor Trust Act 1928 (Note: Geelong Harbor Trust Act 1928 (19 Geo. V. No. 3691)) as a Road, to provide for the Vesting in the Geelong Harbor Trust Commissioners of certain Land in the Parish of Moorpanyal, and for other purposes. (Repealed by Statute Law Revision (Repeals) Act 1982 (No. 9863))
| Melbourne Cricket Club (Guarantee) Act 1958 | No. 6454 | 25 November 1958 |
An Act to guarantee the Repayment of certain Moneys proposed to be borrowed by the Committee of the Melbourne Cricket Club, and for other purposes.
| Companies Act 1958 | No. 6455 | 2 December 1958 |
An Act to consolidate and amend the Law relating to Companies.
| Local Government (City of Oakleigh) Act 1958 (repealed) | No. 6456 | 2 December 1958 |
An Act to Validate the Rate made by the City of Oakleigh on the Ninth day of December One thousand nine hundred and fifty-seven and to authorize the Repayment of certain Loans, and for other purposes. (Repealed by Statute Law Revision (Repeals) Act 1982 (No. 9863))
| Co-operative Housing Societies (Residential Flats) Act 1958 (repealed) | No. 6457 | 2 December 1958 |
An Act to make Provision with respect to the Making of Advances by Co-operative Housing Societies upon the Security of Freehold Estates in Residential Flats. (Repealed by Statute Law Revision (Repeals) Act 1982 (No. 9863))
| Transport Regulation (Fund) Act 1958 (repealed) | No. 6458 | 9 December 1958 |
An Act to amend Section Forty-one of the Transport Regulation Act 1958. (Note: Transport Regulation Act 1958 (No. 6400)) (Repealed by Statute Law Revision (Repeals) Act 1982 (No. 9863))
| Railways (Standardization Agreement) Act 1958 (repealed) | No. 6459 | 9 December 1958 |
An Act to authorize and ratify the Execution by and on behalf of the State of Victoria of an Agreement between the Commonwealth and the States of New South Wales and Victoria in relation to the Standardization of certain Railways, and for other purposes. (Repealed by Transport Acts (Amendment) Act 1997 (No. 106 of 1997))
| Water Supply Loan Application Act 1958 (repealed) | No. 6460 | 9 December 1958 |
An Act to sanction the Issue and Application of Loan Money for Works and other Purposes relating to Irrigation Water Supply Drainage Sewerage Flood Protection and River Improvement, and for other purposes. (Repealed by Treasury Legislation (Repeal) Act 2005 (No. 73 of 2005))
| Co-operative Housing Societies (Insurance) Act 1958 (repealed) | No. 6461 | 9 December 1958 |
An Act to amend Section Twenty-six of the Co-operative Housing Societies Act 1957. (Repealed by Statute Law Revision (Repeals) Act 1982 (No. 9863))
| Racing (Amendment) Act 1958 (repealed) | No. 6462 | 9 December 1958 |
An Act to amend Sections Five, Forty-six and Forty-nine of and the Second Schedule to the Racing Act 1957. (Note: Racing Act 1957 (No. 6070); this was amended by the Sessional Acts Revision Act 1958 (No. 6489) to a reference to the Racing Act 1958 (No. 6353)) (Repealed by Statute Law Revision (Repeals) Act 1982 (No. 9863))
| Motor Car (Third-Party Insurance) Act 1958 (repealed) | No. 6463 | 9 December 1958 |
An Act to amend the Law relating to Notices of certain Claims in respect of Third-party Insurance under the Motor Car Act 1951. (Note: Motor Car Act 1951 (No. 5616); this was amended by the Sessional Acts Revision Act 1958 (No. 6489) to a reference to the Motor Car Act 1958 (No. 6325)) (Repealed by Statute Law Revision (Repeals) Act 1982 (No. 9863))
| Firearms (Amendment) Act 1958 (repealed) | No. 6464 | 9 December 1958 |
An Act to amend the Firearms Act 1951. (Note: Firearms Act 1951 (No. 5610); this was amended by the Sessional Acts Revision Act 1958 (No. 6489) to a reference to the Firearms Act 1958 (No. 6251)) (Repealed by Statute Law Revision (Repeals) Act 1982 (No. 9863))
| Hawthorn and Kew Railway (Dismantling) Act 1958 | No. 6465 | 9 December 1958 |
An Act to provide for the Dismantling of the Hawthorn and Kew Railway, and for other purposes.
| Juries (Amendment) Act 1958 | No. 6466 | 9 December 1958 |
An Act to make Provision with respect to Pools of Jurors for the Trial of Civil and Criminal Inquests in the Supreme Court, County Court and Court of General Sessions at Melbourne and to the Constitution of Juries in Civil Inquests, and for other purposes.
| Tourist (Amendment) Act 1958 (repealed) | No. 6467 | 9 December 1958 |
An Act to amend Section Four of the Tourist Act 1958 (Note: Tourist Act 1958 (No. 6395)) and to make Provision for the Transfer of Tourist Bureaux from the Victorian Railways Commissioners to the Tourist Authority. (Repealed by Statute Law Revision (Repeals) Act 1982 (No. 9863))
| Filled Milk Act 1958 (repealed) | No. 6468 | 9 December 1958 |
An Act to prohibit the Manufacture and Sale of Filled Milk, and for other purposes. (Repealed by Dairy Industry Act 1984 (No. 10171))
| St. Kilda and Brighton Electric Street Railway (Dismantling) Act 1958 (repealed) | No. 6469 | 9 December 1958 |
An Act relating to the Dismantling of the St. Kilda and Brighton Electric Street Railway, and for other purposes. (Repealed by Transport Act 1983 (No. 9921))
| Judges Salaries Act 1958 (repealed) | No. 6470 | 9 December 1958 |
An Act relating to the Salaries of Judges of the Supreme Court and County Court. (Repealed by Statute Law Revision (Repeals) Act 1982 (No. 9863))
| Public Officers Salaries and Allowances Act 1958 (repealed) | No. 6471 | 9 December 1958 |
An Act relating to the Salaries Allowances and Fees of certain Public Officers. (Repealed by Statute Law Revision (Repeals) Act 1982 (No. 9863))
| Ballaarat Railway Land Act 1958 (repealed) | No. 6472 | 9 December 1958 |
An Act relating to certain Railway Land at Ballaarat. (Repealed by Statute Law Revision (Repeals) Act 1982 (No. 9863))
| Game (Licences) Act 1958 (repealed) | No. 6473 | 9 December 1958 |
An Act relating to the Issue of Game Licences, and for other purposes. (Repealed by Statute Law Revision (Repeals) Act 1982 (No. 9863))
| Geelong Waterworks and Sewerage (Amendment) Act 1958 (repealed) | No. 6474 | 9 December 1958 |
An Act to further amend Sections One hundred and twenty-two and One hundred and twenty-five of the Geelong Waterworks and Sewerage Act 1928. (Note: Geelong Waterworks and Sewerage Act 1928 (19 Geo. V. No. 3692); this was amended by the Sessional Acts Revision Act 1958 (No. 6489) to a reference to the Geelong Waterworks and Sewerage Act 1958 (No. 6263)) (Repealed by Statute Law Revision (Repeals) Act 1982 (No. 9863))
| Coal Mine Workers Pensions (Early Retirement) Act 1958 (repealed) | No. 6475 | 9 December 1958 |
An Act to provide for the Early Retirement of certain Coal Mine Workers, and for other purposes. (Repealed by Statute Law Revision (Repeals) Act 1982 (No. 9863))
| Revenue Deficit Funding Act 1958 (repealed) | No. 6476 | 9 December 1958 |
An Act to sanction the Issue and Application of Loan Money for Transfer to the Consolidated Revenue to meet the Deficit therein for the year 1957-58. (Repealed by Statute Law Revision (Repeals) Act 1982 (No. 9863))
| Railway Loan Application Act 1958 (repealed) | No. 6477 | 9 December 1958 |
An Act to sanction the Issue and Application of Loan Money for Works and Purposes relating to Railways, and for other purposes. (Repealed by Statute Law Revision (Repeals) Act 1982 (No. 9863))
| Administration and Probate (Amendment) Act 1958 | No. 6478 | 16 December 1958 |
An Act to amend the Law relating to Duties payable on the Estates of Deceased Persons and for other purposes.
| Local Government Department Act 1958 | No. 6479 | 16 December 1958 |
An Act to establish a Local Government Department, and for other purposes.
| Police Offences (Gaming) Act 1958 (repealed) | No. 6480 | 16 December 1958 |
An Act to amend Part IV. of the Police Offences Act 1957. (Note: Police Offences Act 1957 (No. 6069); this was amended by the Sessional Acts Revision Act 1958 (No. 6489) to a reference to the Police Offences Act 1958 (No. 6337)) (Repealed by Statute Law Revision (Repeals) Act 1982 (No. 9863))
| Marine (Amendment) Act 1958 (repealed) | No. 6481 | 16 December 1958 |
An Act to amend Part V. of the Marine Act 1928, (Note: Marine Act 1928 (19 Geo. V. No. 3723); this was amended by the Sessional Acts Revision Act 1958 (No. 6489) to a reference to the Marine Act 1958 (No. 6302)) and for other purposes. (Repealed by Statute Law Revision (Repeals) Act 1982 (No. 9863))
| Public Works Loan Application Act 1958 (repealed) | No. 6482 | 16 December 1958 |
An Act to sanction the Issue and Application of Loan Money for Public Works and other Purposes. (Repealed by Statute Law Revision (Repeals) Act 1982 (No. 9863))
| Motor Car (Amendment) Act 1958 (repealed) | No. 6483 | 16 December 1958 |
An Act to amend the Law relating to Motor Cars. (Repealed by Statute Law Revision (Repeals) Act 1982 (No. 9863))
| | No. 6484 | 16 December 1958 |
An Act to apply a sum out of the Consolidated Revenue to the service of the year ending on the thirtieth day of June One thousand nine hundred and fifty-nine and to appropriate the Supplies granted in this and the last preceding Session of Parliament. (Repealed by Statute Law Revision (Repeals) Act 1982 (No. 9863))
| Water (Valuations) Act 1958 (repealed) | No. 6485 | 16 December 1958 |
An Act to make Provision with respect to certain Valuations of Rateable Properties within Districts subject to the Jurisdiction of the State Rivers and Water Supply Commission, and for other purposes. (Repealed by Statute Law Revision (Repeals) Act 1982 (No. 9863))
| Police Regulation (Amendment) Act 1958 (repealed) | No. 6486 | 16 December 1958 |
An Act to amend Section Sixty-four and the Fourth Schedule of the Police Regulation Act 1958. (Note: Police Regulation Act 1958 (No. 6338)) (Repealed by Statute Law Revision (Repeals) Act 1982 (No. 9863))
| State Forests Loan Application Act 1958 (repealed) | No. 6487 | 16 December 1958 |
An Act to sanction the Issue and Application of Loan Money for Works and other Purposes relating to State Forests. (Repealed by Statute Law Revision (Repeals) Act 1982 (No. 9863))

== Sources ==
- "1958 Victorian Historical Acts". AustLII.
