= Metropolitan Fire Brigade =

Metropolitan Fire Brigade (MFB) could refer to:

- Metropolitan Fire Brigade (London)
- Metropolitan Fire Brigade (Melbourne)
