= Fire Rescue Victoria =

Australian firefighting organization

Operational area
- Country: Australia
- State: Victoria
- Address: Eastern Hill Fire Station; 456 Albert Street, East Melbourne

Agency overview
- Established: 1 July 2020
- Employees: Operational: 3,489; Non-operational: 607; (FTE Dec 2020)
- Annual budget: A$1 billion (2020)
- Staffing: Career
- Commissioner: Gavin Freeman

Facilities and equipment
- Districts: 10
- Stations: 85
- Pumpers & pumper tankers: 109
- Aerial appliances: 17
- Rescues: 8
- HAZMATs: 4
- Breathing apparatus: 5
- Fireboats: 4

Website
- frv.vic.gov.au

Urban and regional areas serviced by Fire Rescue Victoria

Fire Rescue Victoria (FRV) is a fire and rescue service in the state of Victoria, Australia, that provides firefighting, rescue, HAZMAT and Emergency Medical Response services in areas of metropolitan Melbourne and major regional centres throughout Victoria.

FRV operates 85 fire stations with full-time staff firefighters, around half of which are in the Melbourne metropolitan area, and the remainder in regional cities and large towns throughout the state. 34 of these stations which are classified as peri-urban and regional stations, are co-located with volunteer brigades of the Country Fire Authority (CFA).

FRV was formed on 1 July 2020 by a merger of the Metropolitan Fire Brigade (MFB), a fully career service responsible for much of the Greater Melbourne area, with the 1400 career firefighters of the CFA, some of whom had operated in "integrated" staff and volunteer brigades on the Melbourne urban fringe and in other centres. Ex-FRV Commissioner Ken Block stated on 1 July 2020 that under the CFA and MFB merge; Fire Rescue Victoria is now made up of more than 3600 operational firefighters.

== History ==
With the passage of the Fire Brigades Act 1890 (54 Vict. No. 1200) by the Parliament of Victoria, the colony of Victoria's fire services were divided into two components. The Metropolitan Fire Brigade, largely a paid professional force, was established to serve the Metropolitan Fire District, roughly encompassing the area within a ten-mile radius of the Melbourne CBD; and the volunteer brigades in remainder of the colony was placed under the control of the Country Fire Brigades Board. Several reforms to the fire services over the following half-century left this basic structure in place, and in 1958 the MFB and what had become the Country Fire Authority were re-established under their own acts of Parliament to, respectively, provide full-time fire services to the MFD, and to establish, coordinate and fund fire brigades in the rest of the state, whether "permanent or volunteer".

The acts provided for the boundaries of the Metropolitan Fire District to be reviewed and altered, and in the 1960s the MFD was expanded to cover most of what was then metropolitan Melbourne. It was, however, to be the last significant such expansion. From around the same time, the United Firefighters Union, which represented MFB employees, began to campaign for the amalgamation of MFB and CFA in combination with a significant expansion of the paid firefighting force. The move was resisted by the CFA Officers' Association and senior management, as well as conservative governments unsympathetic to the UFU. When a Labor state government in 1982, for the first time in 27 years, it immediately set about reforming the fire services, and proposed governing the MFB and CFA under a single Victorian Fire and Emergency Services Board, with a general manager responsible for the day-to-day operation of each service. Volunteers' associations strenuously opposed the idea, arguing that Labor governments would use the opportunity to allocate fewer resources to country firefighting, and that a Melbourne-based bureaucracy was incapable of understanding the needs of country firefighters.

Following the Black Saturday bushfires, the 2009 Victorian Bushfires Royal Commission (2009 VBRC) recommended that a Fire Commissioner be appointed to advise on the boundary between the two services, the Metropolitan Fire District.

The origins of the service created significant political controversy. The genesis for the proposal to split paid and volunteer firefighters, creating two separate services where the integrated turnout model would no long apply, was to resolve an industrial dispute arising from Enterprise Bargaining Agreement negotiations between the CFA and the UFU.

== Governance ==
=== Legislation ===
The Fire Rescue Victoria Act 1958 (No. 6315), amended and retitled from the Metropolitan Fire Brigades Act 1958, establishes the Fire Rescue Commissioner as the head of a body corporate named Fire Rescue Victoria, the successor in law to the Metropolitan Fire and Emergency Services Board. The functions of FRV set out by the act are:

to provide for fire suppression and fire prevention services in the Fire Rescue Victoria fire district; and

to provide for emergency prevention and response services in the Fire Rescue Victoria fire district; and

to implement the fire and emergency services priorities of the Government of Victoria; and

to provide operational and management support to the Country Fire Authority in consultation with and as agreed by the Authority... and

to carry out any other functions conferred on Fire Rescue Victoria by or under this Act or the regulations or any other Act or any regulations under that Act.

— Section 7(1), Fire Rescue Victoria Act 1958.

The act also requires FRV to assist in the response to any major emergency within Victoria, in cooperation with other emergency service organisations and under the direction of Emergency Management Victoria (EMV). The act grants FRV broad powers to carry out its functions as directed by the commissioner. Additional powers and duties of FRV and the Commissioner are established by other legislation, including:

- Electricity Safety Act 1998
- Emergency Management Act 1986
- Emergency Management Act 2013
- Gas Safety Act 1997
- Building Act 1993
- Building Regulations 2018

In the State Emergency Response Plan published by EMV, FRV is the control agency within the FRV Fire District for accidents, including gas leaks, hazardous materials incidents and collapses; fires and explosions; and transport, industrial, high angle and confined space rescues. It supports CFA with these incidents outside the FRV Fire District and other agencies as required.

The Fire Rescue Commissioner and any deputy commissioners are appointed by the Governor of Victoria on the advice of the minister responsible for fire services, for a period of not longer than five years. The minister may give the Commissioner general direction on policies and priorities of Fire Rescue Victoria but has no power to make operational or strategic decisions, such as on the location of fire stations or the conduct of firefighting operations.

=== Fire District Review Panel ===
The Fire Rescue Victoria Act 1958 establishes a three-member Fire District Review Panel required to report at least every four years, or on the request of the Minister, on whether the boundaries Fire Rescue Victoria Fire District should be altered to provide for appropriate emergency services coverage. Members of the Review Panel are required to have expertise in fire and emergency services policy, but must not be current members of a Victorian fire service, firefighters' union or volunteers' association.

The final decision on whether to alter the FRV Fire District boundaries is that of the Minister. However, any recommendations of the Review Panel must be made publicly available by both FRV and CFA, regardless of whether they are accepted.

The Fire District Review Panel mechanism was initially recommended by the Royal Commission into the 2009 bushfires. It is intended to provide an objective, independent decision-making process for determining where professional and volunteer firefighters operate, in order to alleviate some of the tensions which led to the formation of FRV. However, the initial FRV Fire District was not subject to the Review Panel process.

== Structure ==
The Fire Rescue Commissioner is supported by five Deputy Commissioners and a Deputy Secretary. One Deputy Commissioner is attached to the Office of the Fire Rescue Commissioner. Two operational regions, North & West and South, East & Central, are led by Deputy Commissioners. Two further Deputy Commissioners are assigned to the portfolios of Strategy, Community Safety and Operational Training. The Deputy Secretary leads non-operational and corporate services.

Each of the North & West and South, East & Central regions are further divided into five districts, as follows:

North & West	South, East & Central
Northern	Central
Western 1	Eastern
Western 2	Southern 1
Western 3	Southern 2
North & West Regional	South & East Regional

== Stations and equipment ==
=== Appliance overview ===
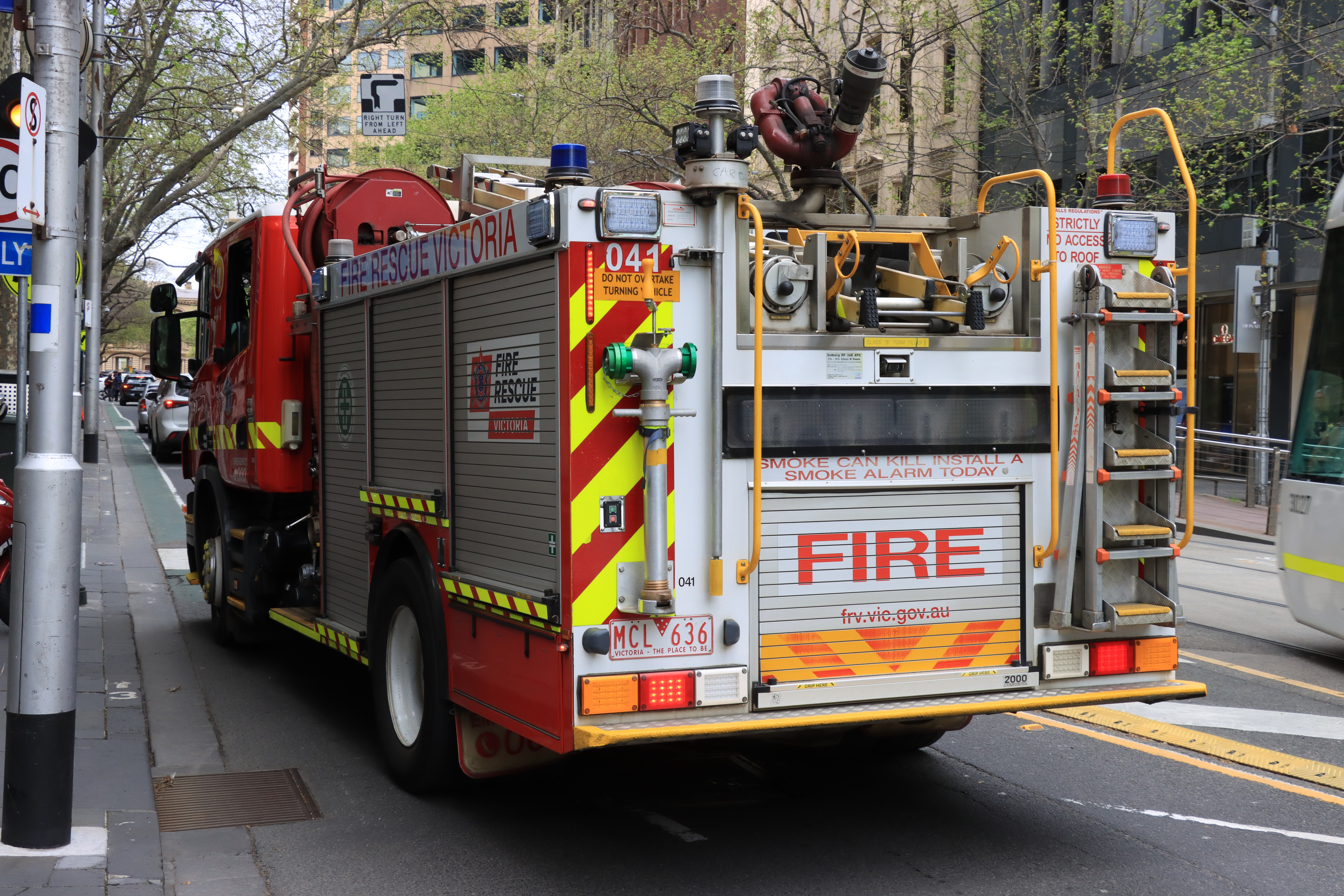
Pumper No. 041 on Collins Street, Melbourne in Fire Rescue Victoria livery.

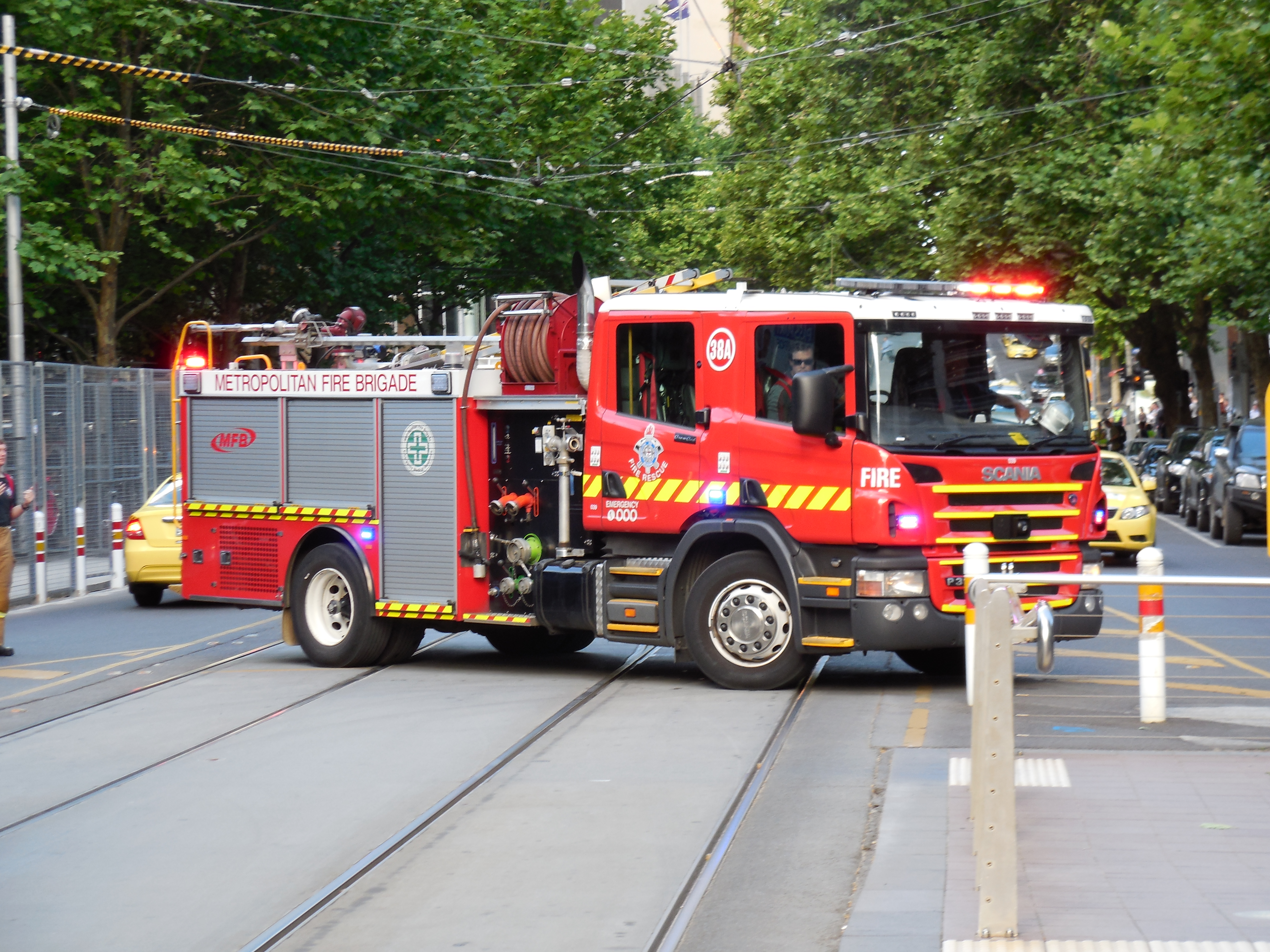
A Scania pumper with previous MFB markings.

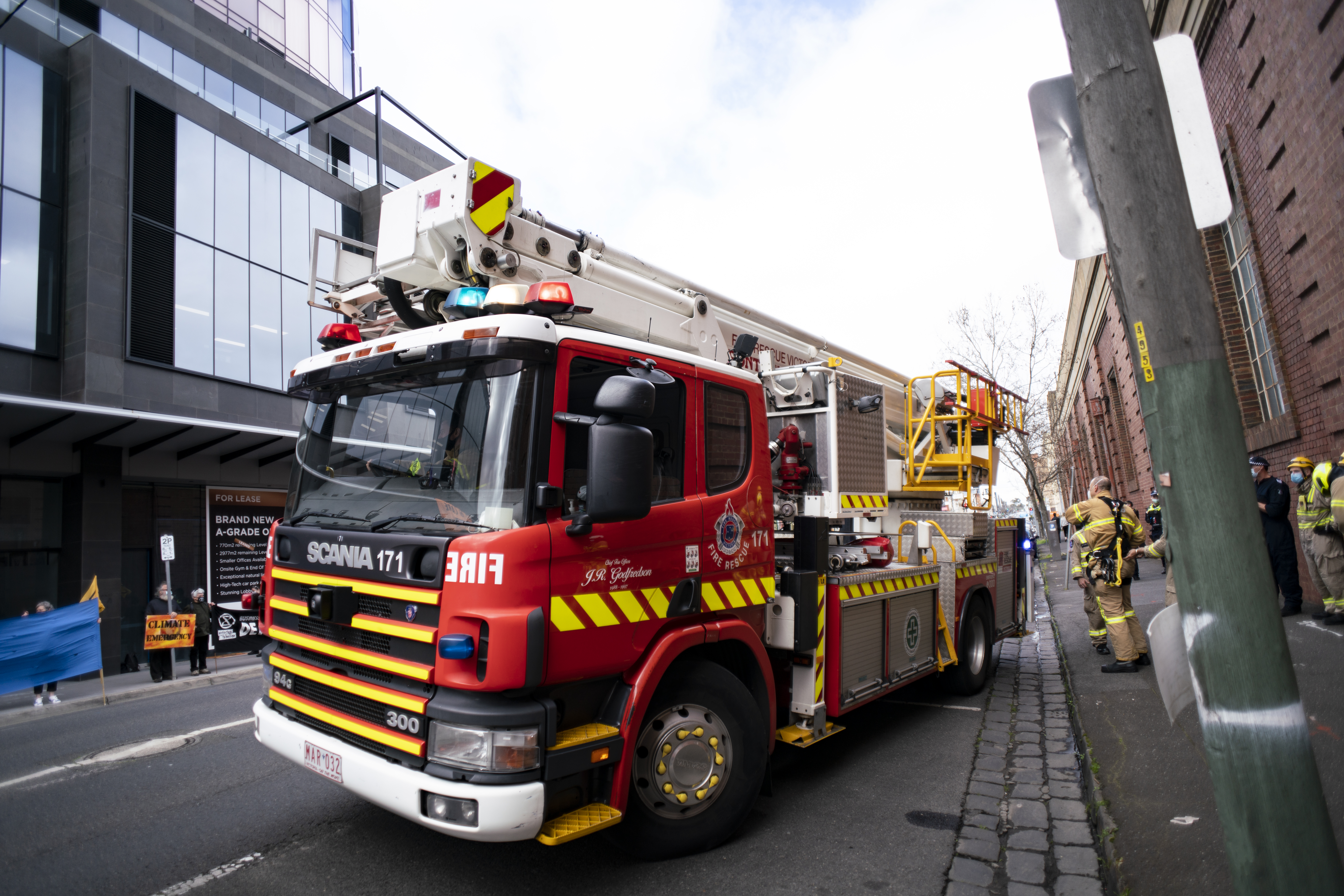
Ladder Platform appliance (car 171, reserve pool)

All FRV stations operate at least one pumper or pumper tanker, with stations 1 (Eastern Hill) and 42 (Newport) operating an Ultra Large Pumper. Aerial and specialist appliances are located across the Melbourne area and in many of the regional cities, from where they also provide support into CFA areas.

Code	Appliance type
AP	Aerial Pumper
BA	Breathing Apparatus
BS	Breathing Apparatus Support
CE	Concept Electric Pumper (EVIE)
CU	Control Unit (Command Bus)
DC	District Car
FB	Fireboat
HZ	Hazardous Materials (HAZMAT)
LP	Ladder Platform
P	Pumper
PP	Pumper Platform
PT	Pumper Tanker
RHB	Rehabilitation
R	Rescue
T	Transporter
TB	Teleboom
TR	Technical Rescue
UP	Ultra Large Pumper

A system of modular "pods", carried by Transporters fitted with hydraulic lift arms, is also used to support specialised operations.

Code	Pod type
BA	Breathing Apparatus
BAC	Breathing Apparatus Compressor
BAT	Breathing Apparatus Transport
BDS	Bulk Decontamination Support
CEP	Community Events Pod
DFS	DEBRiS Fireground Support Pod
ERM	Equipment and Resource Management
FMA	Fitness Module
FDA/B	Fire Duty Support
FOA	Foam Module
FXH	Flexible Habitat
HAR	High Angle Rescue
HLA/B	Hose Layer
HR	Heavy Rescue Support
HZS	HAZMAT Support
MAS	Multi Agency Support
MLA	Mechanical Loader
RDA	Rapid Decontamination
TIM	Timber Rescue Support
TR	Technical Rescue
USR	Urban Search and Rescue
WER	Waterways Emergency Response
WRM	Water Recycling Module

=== Stations ===
No	Name	District	FRV appliances			Co-located with CFA/AV
No	Name	District	Pumper	Aerial	Specialist & support	Co-located with CFA/AV
1	Eastern Hill	Central	P1A, P1B, UP1	LP1	CU1A, CU1B (When Required), DC1A, RHB1	
2	West Melbourne	Central	P2A, P2B			
3	Carlton	Central	P3		R3^ (Getting new Rescue, current will go to reserve)	Yes (AV)
4	Brunswick	Central	P4			
5	Broadmeadows	Northern	PT5			
6	Pascoe Vale	Northern	PT6			
7	Thomastown	Northern	PT7	TB7	R7, DC7A, DC7B, BS7	
8	Burnley Complex	Training and administration facility, multiple training pumpers and other FRV appliances located there				
9	Somerton	Northern	P9, PT9			
10	Richmond	Central	P10	TB10	T10A, T10B; Pods: BA, BD, FDS, GP, HART, HL, HR, USAR-1, TRS	
11	Epping	Northern	PT11			
12	Preston	Northern	P12			
13	Northcote	Central	P13			
14	Bundoora	Northern	PT14, P14			
15	Heidelberg	Northern	P15			
16	Greensborough	Northern	PT16			
17	Donnybrook (Number allocated for future expansion)	Northern	TBA	TBA	TBA	
18	Hawthorn	Central	P18			
19	North Balwyn	Eastern	PT19			
20	Box Hill	Eastern	P20A, P20B		DC20	
22	Ringwood	Eastern	PT22	TB22		
23	Burwood	Eastern	P23		Pod: WRM-5	
24	Glen Iris	Southern 1	P24			
25	Oakleigh	Southern 1	P25	TB25 (Currently running as TB44), LP25	R25, DC25	
26	Croydon	Eastern	P26, PT26			
27	Nunawading	Eastern	PT27		R27, RHB27^	
28	Vermont South	Eastern	PT28			
29	Clayton	Southern 1	PT29			
30	Templestowe	Eastern	PT30			
31	Glen Waverley	Southern 1	P31, PT31			
32	Ormond	Southern 1	P32			
33	Mentone	Southern 1	PT33			
34	Highett	Southern 1	P34, PT34			
35	Windsor	Central	P35A, P35B	LP35		
38	South Melbourne	Central	P38A, P38B		BA38, BS38, HZ38	
39	Port Melbourne	Central	P39A, P39B		FS39 also respond nearby fireboats: FB1, FB2, FB4, FB6.	
40	Laverton	Western 1	PT40			
41	St Albans	Western 2	PT41			
42	Newport	Western 1	P42, UP42			
43	Deer Park	Western 2	P43			
44	Sunshine	Western 2	PT44	TB44 (Getting replaced by a new Pumper Platform	R44, DC44A, DC44B; Pods: ERM, WRM–3	
45	Brooklyn (formerly Spotswood)	Western 1	P45			
46	Altona	Western 1	PT46			
47	Footscray	Western 1	P47	LP47	T47; Pods: FDS, HL, ML	
48	Taylors Lakes	Western 2	PT48			
50	Ascot Vale	Central	P50			
51	Keilor	Western 2	P51, PT51			
52	Tullamarine	Western 2	PT52			
53	Sunbury	Western 2	P53			Yes
54	Greenvale	Western 2	P54			Yes
55	Caroline Springs	Western 2	P55			Yes
56	Melton	Western 2	P56		R56	Yes
57	Tarneit	Western 1	P57			
58	Point Cook	Western 1	P58			Yes
59	Derrimut	Western 1	PT59A, PT59B		RHB59^, DC59, BS59^ (Getting 68's old BS)	
60	VEMTC Craigieburn	Training and administration facility, multiple training pumpers and other FRV appliances located there				
61	Lara	Western 3	P61		HZ61	Yes
62	Corio	Western 3	P62A, P62B			Yes
63	Geelong City	Western 3	P63A, P63B	LP63	R63^ (Getting new Rescue, current will go to reserve)	Yes
64	Belmont	Western 3	P64			Yes
65	Armstrong Creek (future – under construction)	Western 3	P65	TBA	TBA	Will be (CFA)
66	Ocean Grove	Western 3	P66			Yes
67	Ballarat City	North & West Regional	P67A, P67B	LP67		No (CFA separate)
68	Lucas	North & West Regional	P68		HZ68, BS68^ (Getting New BS), T68; Pods: TR	
70	Warrnambool	North & West Regional	P70 P70C*	PP70	T70; Pods: TR	Yes
71	Portland	North & West Regional	P71			Yes
72	Mildura	North & West Regional	P72 P72C*	PP72	TR72*	Yes
73	Bendigo	North & West Regional	P73A, P73B	LP73	BA73, TR73*	
74	Wangaratta	South & East Regional	P74		T74; Pods: TR	Yes
75	Shepparton	South & East Regional	P75	PP75	HZ75	Yes
76	Wodonga	South & East Regional	P76, PT76			Yes
77	Traralgon	South & East Regional	P77	LP77		Yes
78	Morwell	South & East Regional	P78	AP78	T78 Pods: TR	Yes
79	Latrobe West	South & East Regional	P79			
80	Craigieburn	Northern	P80			Yes
81	South Morang	Northern	P81			Yes
82	Eltham City	Eastern	P82			
84	South Warrandyte	Eastern	P84			Yes
85	Boronia	Eastern	P85			Yes
86	Rowville	Southern 1	P86			Yes
87	Dandenong	Southern 2	P87A, P87B	LP87	R87, TR87*	Yes
88	Hallam	Southern 2	P88		HZ88	Yes
89	Springvale	Southern 1	P89			Yes
90	Patterson River	Southern 1	P90			Yes
91	Frankston	Southern 2	P91	AP91		Yes
92	Cranbourne	Southern 2	P92			Yes
93	Pakenham	Southern 2	P93		DC93	Yes
94	Mornington	Southern 2	P94			Yes
95	Rosebud	Southern 2	P95			Yes
97	Clyde North (land purchased – under construction)	Southern 2	TBA	TBA	TBA	
00	Reserve	Statewide	21x Div A P, 6x Mk4 PT, 1x Mk5 PT, 10x Div B P	4 x LP, 1x AP	1x Div A R (To be 2x shortly), 2x Div B Rescue (to be 3x shortly), 2x T	No

*Appliances are not manned 24/7, when required a recall for staff is requested.

^Appliances are being transferred or commissioned

== History of legislation ==
The legislation was presented to the Victorian Upper house just before Easter 2018, and led to a record sitting to allow it to pass, including controversy over pairing of a cross bench member and accusations the Government was using the absence of a sick MP, an independent who was the casting vote on the legislation, to push through a vote in her absence by extending the sitting into Good Friday, which had never happened before. The legislation was defeated on the third reading on Easter Sunday. The bill was a "Disputed Bill" and could be considered after the next election by a committee known as the Dispute Resolution Committee in line with the Constitutional (Parliamentary Reform) Act 2003. The bill was reintroduced on 29 May 2019 and passed through both houses on 20 June 2019, becoming the Firefighters' Presumptive Rights Compensation and Fire Services Legislation Amendment (Reform) Act 2019 (No. 20 of 2019).

== Bibliography ==
- Robert, Murray; White, Kate (1995). State of fire: a history of volunteer fire fighting and the Country Fire Authority in Victoria. Fitzroy, Vic.: Hargreen.
