= 1965 Gippsland Bushfires =

Bushfires in Victoria, Australia

For many weeks between 16 February and late March 1965, major bushfires burnt across a wide landscape of Gippsland in Victoria, Australia, from Lake Glenmaggie in the west to well beyond Bruthen and Tambo Crossing in the east.

Nearly one million acres of State forest and pasture were burnt. The Forests Commission Victoria (FCV) and Country Fire Authority (CFA) faced their gravest bushfire threat since Black Friday in 1939.

There were many other bushfires across the state that summer, but the ones in Gippsland reached disastrous proportions, culminating in the declaration of a State of Emergency on 5 March when the Army and Air Force were called in to assist.
