= Eastern Hill Fire Station =

Heritage-listed fire station in Victoria, Australia

Coordinates: 37.808551°S 144.975227°E

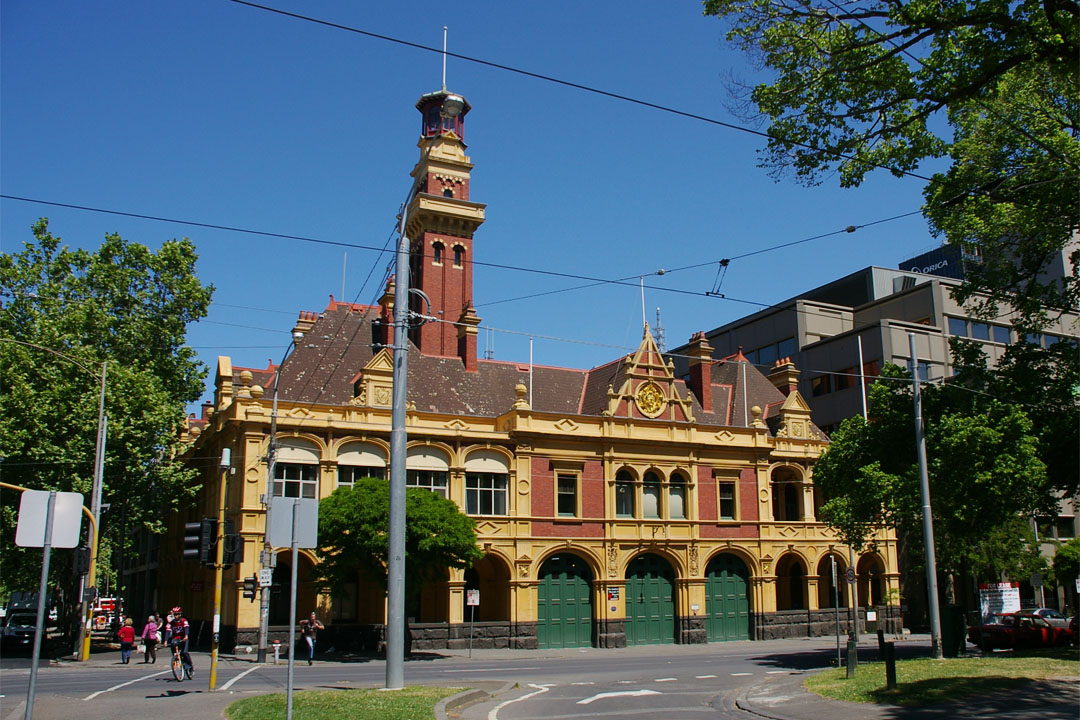
Former Eastern Hill Fire Station

Eastern Hill Fire Station is the central fire station of Melbourne, Victoria, located on the corner of Victoria Parade and Gisborne Street at one of the highest points in the City. The building has been recognised as historically significant by the Heritage Council of Victoria and is listed on the Victorian Heritage Register. It no longer operates as a fire station but holds the Fire Services Museum of Victoria.

Construction of the station was begun in 1891 and the station opened on 3 November 1893, as the headquarters and city fire station for the newly formed Metropolitan Fire Brigade. It was designed by architecture firms Lloyd Tayler & Fitts, and Smith & Johnson, who both won the competition, and combined to produce this striking Australian Queen Anne style building. The building contained living quarters, stables, workshops, and offices. A watchtower was initially staffed 24 hours a day.

Firefighters lived on the premises until the 1970s. In 1972 a new station was begun next door, designed by Bates Smart McCutcheon in the Brutalist style, with the fire trucks now exiting onto Gisborne Street instead of Victoria Parade. The new building and refurbished old station was opened on 8 March 1979.

Parts of the old building are still used for offices, while the Fire Services Museum of Victoria now occupies the majority of the bottom floor of the old station. The Museum contains exhibits pertaining to the old MFB Board, the Chief Fire Officer, a showcase of fully refurbished fire appliances, a display of international firefighting garments and a dedication to the MFB's sister firefighting organisation, the Country Fire Authority.

Eastern Hill Fire Station is known as Fire Station 1 inside the Metropolitan Fire Brigade.
