= Metropolitan Fire Brigade (Melbourne) =

Fire service in Victoria, Australia, 1891–2020

Operational area
- Country: Australia
- State: Victoria
- City: Melbourne

Agency overview
- Established: 1891
- Dissolved: 30 June 2020
- Annual calls: 38,958 (2017)
- Employees: 2,297 (2017)
- Annual budget: A$407,849 (2017)
- Staffing: Career
- Fire chief: David Bruce

Facilities and equipment
- Divisions: 2
- Battalions: 5
- Stations: 47
- Rescues: 5

Website
- Official website

The Metropolitan Fire Brigade (MFB), also known as the Metropolitan Fire and Emergency Services Board, was a fire service in Victoria, Australia. The MFB provided firefighting, rescue, medical and hazardous material incident response services to the metropolitan area of Melbourne. The MFB's headquarters were located at the Eastern Hill Fire Station (also known as Fire Station 1) in East Melbourne.

The MFB was abolished in 2020 and its stations and firefighters absorbed into the newly created Fire Rescue Victoria.

== History ==
The first known fire brigade in Melbourne was the volunteer Melbourne Fire Prevention Society established in 1845. Over a period of years a number of volunteer brigades were formed bearing the names of insurance companies and municipalities, and other institutions e.g. Carlton Brewery, Fitzroy Temperance. There was intense rivalry between these brigades. Buildings had wooden or metal plaques in the form of an insurance brigades coat of arms or firemark affixed to their exteriors denoting which insurance company had the building under its care. When the fire alarm was given many companies would rush to the scene, the mark would be inspected, and only the brigade that owned the mark would fight the fire while the other companies would do their best to hinder the operation. By 1890 there were 56 such volunteer brigades in Melbourne.

After several serious fires in 1890, with the loss of life of six firefighters in addition to loss of property, the Fire Brigades Act 1890 (54 Vict. No. 1200) was passed with the aim of uniting these rival fire brigades. The first meeting of the Metropolitan Fire Brigade (MFB) board took place on 6 March 1891, and led to the disbanding of the then 56 volunteer brigades in Melbourne on 30 April 1891 with an invitation to firefighters to join the new organisation. On May 1891, the Melbourne Fire Brigade became the main fire brigade in Melbourne.

The first fire station constructed by the MFB was the Eastern Hill Fire Station, opposite St Peter's, Eastern Hill, one of the highest points in the city of Melbourne. Construction commenced in 1891 and the station opened on 3 November 1893. The building contained living quarters, stables, workshops, and offices. A watchtower was initially occupied 24 hours a day. Firefighters lived on the premises until the 1970s.

In 1950, volunteer and partly-paid firefighters were discontinued in favour of solely full-time fire service. In September 1988, female firefighters were permitted to join the MFB.

The MFB had more than 2200 employees, including over 1900 firefighters and almost 350 corporate staff.

In 2019, the Firefighters' Presumptive Rights Compensation and Fire Services Legislation Amendment (Reform) Act 2019 (No. 20 of 2019), which abolished the MFB and replaced it with a new organisation, Fire Rescue Victoria (FRV), passed the Parliament of Victoria. FRV assumed all of the functions of the MFB, as well as employing all paid firefighters across the state, including those on the outskirts of Melbourne and in regional cities previously employed by the Country Fire Authority.

== Functions ==
The functions of the MFB are set out in section 2 of the Metropolitan Fire Brigades Act 1958 (No. 6315) as being to provide fire suppression and fire prevention services as well as emergency prevention and response services in the Metropolitan Fire District.

The MFB responds to about 38,000 calls per year for a range of Emergencies including:

- fires (structure, non-structure, bushfire)
- hazardous incidents
- road accident rescue
- emergency medical response (with Ambulance Victoria)
- automatic alarm response
- high angle rescue
- urban search and rescue
- marine response

== Fire stations and appliances ==
The Metropolitan Fire District (MFD) encompasses over 1000 square kilometres of Metropolitan Melbourne, with 47 strategically placed Fire Stations to ensure a timely response to emergencies.
The MFB fire stations are listed below under the five districts which make up the MFD. Central District, Western District and Northern District combine as the North West Metro Region, while Southern District and Eastern District form the South East Metro Region.

=== North West Metro Region ===
==== Central District ====
Station Number	Station Name	Appliance/Callsigns
1	Eastern Hill	P1A, P1B, UP1, LP1, CU1A, DC1A, DC1B, RHB1
2	West Melbourne	P2A, P2B
3	Carlton	P3, R3
10	Richmond	P10, TB10, T10A, T10B, pods: BA, BD, FDS, GP, HAR, HL, HR, USAR-1, TRS
38	South Melbourne	P38A, P38B, BA38, BS38, HZ38
39	Port Melbourne	P39A, P39B
70	South Wharf	FB1, FB2, FB4, FB6, FB11, FB12

==== Western District ====
Station Number	Station Name	Appliance/Callsigns
40	Laverton	PT40
41	St Albans	PT41
42	Newport	PT42, UP42
43	Deer Park	P43, PT43
44	Sunshine	PT44, TB44, R44, DC44A, DC44B, pods: ERM, WRM-3
45	Brooklyn	P45
46	Altona	PT46
47	Footscray	P47, LP47, T47, pods: FDS, HL, ML
48	Taylors Lakes	PT48
49	Laverton North	PT49
50	Ascot Vale	P50
51	Keilor East	P51A, P51B

==== Northern District ====
Station Number	Station Name	Appliance/Callsigns
4	Brunswick	P4
5	Broadmeadows	PT5, WT5
6	Pascoe Vale	PT6
7	Thomastown	PT7, TB7, R7, DC7
9	Somerton	PT9
11	Epping	PT11
12	Preston	P12
13	Northcote	P13
14	Bundoora	P14A, P14B
15	Heidelberg	P15
16	Greensborough	PT16
52	Tullamarine	PT52

=== South East Metro Region ===
==== Southern District ====
Station Number	Station Name	Appliance/Callsigns
24	Malvern East	P24
29	Clayton	PT29
32	Ormond	P32
33	Mentone	PT33
34	Highett	PT34, WT34
35	Windsor	P35A, P35B, LP35

==== Eastern District ====
Station Number	Station Name	Appliance/Callsigns
18	Hawthorn	P18
19	North Balwyn	PT19
20	Box Hill	P20
22	Ringwood	PT22, TB22
23	Burwood	P23, pods: WRM-5
25	Oakleigh	P25, PT25, TB25, LP25, R25, DC25
26	Croydon	P26, PT26
27	Nunawading	PT27, R27
28	Vermont South	PT28
30	Templestowe	P30, PT30
31	Glen Waverley	P31, WT31

== Fire appliance glossary ==
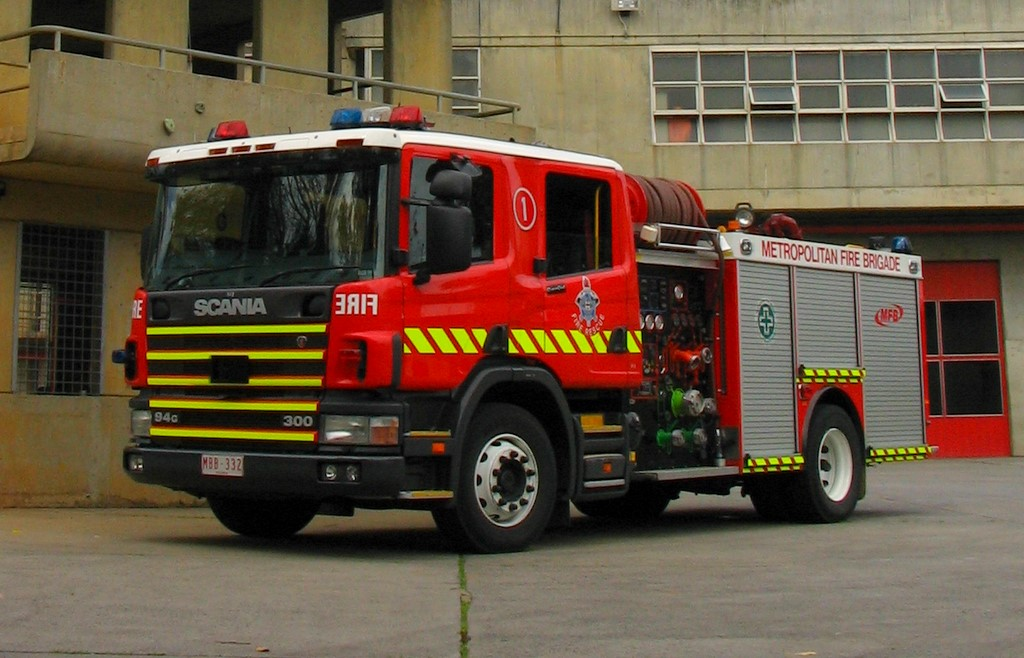
A Mk 5 Pumper

The MFB operates a range of appliances to match the varied firefighting and rescue roles it provides. All stations have at least one pumper or pumper tanker, while some stations also have more specialised appliances such as water tankers, ladder platforms, telebooms, heavy rescue trucks, or other support vehicles.

- Breathing Apparatus Unit (BA)
- Breathing Apparatus Support (BS)
- Command Unit (CU)
- Decontamination Unit (HZ)
- District Car (DC)
- Fire Boat (FB)
- Ladder Platform (LP)
- Pumper (P)
- Pumper Tanker (PT)
- Rescue (R)
- Rehabilitation Unit (RHB)
- Teleboom (TB)
- Transporter (T)
- Ultra Large Pumper (UP)
- Water Tanker (WT) (Mostly out of service now)

Pods:

- Breathing Apparatus (BA)
- Bulk Decontamination (BD)
- Equipment & Resource Management (ERM)
- Fire Duty Support (FDS)
- General Purpose (GP)
- High Angle Rescue (HAR)
- Hose Layer (HL)
- Heavy Rescue Support (HR)
- Mechanical Loader (ML)
- Tipper/Rescue Support (TRS)
- Urban Search & Rescue no.1 (USAR-1)
- Water Recycling Module no.3 (WRM-3)
- Water Recycling Module no.5 (WRM-5)

== Notable incidents ==
- Great fire of 1897 – On 20 November 1897, a fire in Craig Williamson Department Store spread to destroy almost all buildings between Elizabeth Street, Flinders Street, Flinders Lane and Swanston Street (17 buildings in all). It was stopped at the rear of the buildings facing Swanston Street. The recently formed Metropolitan Fire Brigade fought the fire with 10 hose-carts, 7 steamers, 2 ladder-carriages and about 190 personnel.
- William Booth Memorial Home fire – On 13 August 1966, a heater started a fire at a Salvation Army hostel for alcoholic and destitute men. Due to the failure of the staff to immediately call the MFB, and the building's design hindering escape, dozens of victims became trapped. 30 ultimately died, making it the deadliest building fire in Australian history.
- 2018 West Footscray warehouse fire – An illegal chemical storage facility caught fire on 30 August and burned for over a week. A large plume of toxic black smoke drifted over surrounding suburbs.
- 2019 Campbellfield factory fire – A fire began on 5 April at a waste management facility which took 4 days to extinguish. Toxic fumes forced the evacuation of nearby residential suburbs and closure of several schools.

== See also ==
- National Council for Fire & Emergency Services
- Country Fire Authority
- Country Fire Service
- Fire and Rescue New South Wales
