= Country Fire Authority =

Volunteer fire service

Operational area
- Country: Australia
- State: Victoria

Agency overview
- Established: 1945
- Annual calls: 46,485 (FY 2017–18)
- Employees: Operational: 5,000 volunteer Support: 2,483 volunteer (FY 2017–18)

Facilities and equipment
- Regions: 5
- Districts: 21
- Groups: 136
- Stations: 1,228
- Tankers: 1,618
- Pumpers: 242
- Pumper tankers: 38
- Field command vehicles: 400
- Operations vehicles: 255
- Rescue: 28
- HAZMAT: 6
- Ultralight: 285
- Big fill: 28
- Transport: 382

Website
- Official website

The Country Fire Authority (CFA) is a volunteer fire service responsible for fire suppression, rescues, and response to other accidents and hazards across most of the state of Victoria, Australia. CFA comprises over 1,200 brigades organised in 21 districts, and shares responsibility for fire services with Fire Rescue Victoria (FRV), which employs full-time paid firefighters in major urban areas; and Forest Fire Management Victoria (FFMV), which manages fire prevention and suppression on Victoria's public lands. CFA operations and equipment are partly funded by the Victorian Government through its Fire Services Levy, and supplemented by individual brigades' fundraising for vehicles and equipment.

CFA was established in 1944 to reform rural fire management in Victoria after a succession of devastating bushfires. Major bushfire responses conducted by CFA have included those in the Dandenong Ranges in 1962 and 1967, the 1965 Gippsland bushfires, as well as 1983 Ash Wednesday bushfires, 2009 Black Saturday bushfires and 2019–20 south-east Australian bushfires. CFA brigades have also supported responses at fire events interstate and internationally, especially with the Rural Fire Service and Country Fire Service in neighbouring states of New South Wales and South Australia respectively.

CFA's volunteer brigades are supported by professional administrative and operational staff led by the chief executive officer and Chief Officer respectively, under the management of the CFA Board appointed by the Minister for Police and Emergency Services. CFA previously employed a number of paid firefighters in "integrated" brigades in built-up areas within its jurisdiction; in 2020, these were transferred to the newly formed FRV during highly controversial reforms and in many cases share facilities with CFA volunteers. Forestry plantation companies with operations above a certain size are also required by law to form CFA Forest Industry Brigades.

== History ==
The Country Fire Brigades Board (CFBB) was founded by the Fire Brigades Act 1890 (54 Vict. No. 1200) at the same time as the Metropolitan Fire Brigade Board (MFB). The CFBB was given power and responsibility over all fire brigades based more than 10 miles from Melbourne, but largely represented urban brigades in cities and larger towns like Ballarat, Geelong and Bendigo.

The CFBB already had a well-established command structure under Superintendent Lieut-Colonel Theophilus Smith Marshall, but the organisation was divided into two very deeply divided and disparate camps – Urban Brigades and Rural Bush Fire Brigades. The CFBB mostly trained for and responded to structural fires in urban areas.

But for the remainder of rural Victoria, Bush Fire Brigades, mostly made up of local landowners received little or no financial assistance from the State Government and tended to operate independently from their urban counterparts.

Following on the calamitous bushfires of 1926, the Forests Commission Victoria (FCV), having obtained the co-operation of the CFBB and the Lands and Police departments, undertook an extensive campaign to encourage the formation and coordination of rural fire-fighting units. A new Fire Brigades Act 1928 (19 Geo. V. No. 3682) was passed in 1929. Delegations to all country districts were arranged and by 1931, 220 units had been organised in country centres throughout the State, and by 1937 the effective strength of the movement had increased to 320 brigades.

A Bush Fire Brigades Association emerged in about 1914 to represent clusters of ruggedly independent rural landowners and neighbours who formed makeshift brigades that responded quickly to grass and scrub fires in their local farming communities. The Association of Bush Fire Brigades was formalised in 1926 with the support of the FCV. Bush Fire Brigades operated under very different culture, had little formal structure, training or equipment compared to their urban counterparts but these firefighters were passionate, committed and effective volunteers.

But still no state government financial assistance was provided. However, for those close to State forest, National Parks and Crown Land the FCV donated some equipment.

Prior to 1934 all bush fire brigades operated without legal authority or protection. If private property were entered and back fires lit or water taken for the purpose of extinguishing fires, members were potentially open to charges of trespass and damages. Late in 1933 the Bush Fire Brigades Act was passed which provided statutory powers and authority to approved officials of registered brigades. This was a major step forward and conferred considerable powers to the brigade captain. This helped to cement autonomy and gave security for small brigades.

Considered in terms of loss of property and life, the Black Friday bushfires on 13 January 1939 were one of the worst disasters to have occurred in Australia and certainly the worst bushfires up to that time. The 1939 bushfires killed 71 people and burnt 2 million hectares, 69 sawmills, and obliterated several towns. The subsequent Royal Commission conducted by Judge Leonard Stretton has been described as one of the most significant inquiries in the history of Victorian public administration. One of Stretton's key recommendations was to create a single fire service for country Victoria.

The war years then intervened from September 1939, and arguably the legislative reforms recommended by Judge Stretton moved to the back burner.

Then later in the summer of 1943/44 there were more deadly bushfires where 51 people were killed, 700 injured, and 650 buildings were destroyed. In particular, the loss of 13 lives a Yallourn fires on 14 February 1944 and the impact on the State's electricity supplies when the critical brown coal fields caught alight brought these bushfires into sharp focus. There was justifiable public outcry at the lack of government action after the similar events five years earlier in 1939. Premier Albert Dunstan and Forests Minister Albert Lind, who had both delayed legislative changes in Parliament, decided there was no alternative but to ask Judge Stretton to chair a second Royal Commission.

Stretton's report returned to his earlier themes and once again highlighted the lack of cohesive firefighting ability outside the Melbourne Metropolitan Fire Brigade area.

After nearly 6 months of debate in state parliament, legislation to establish the Country Fire Authority (CFA) was finally passed in two stages on 22 November and 6 December 1944. The chairman and board members were appointed on 19 December 1944. On 19 December, the State Premier Albert Dunstan announced that Mr Alexander Mercer King of Ballarat was to be appointed chairman of the CFA board for the first year, along with 12 members. The board of the new authority met for the first time shortly after on 3 January 1945. On 2 April 1945, the Country Fire Authority Act 1945 came into force, and the previous entities ceased to exist.

The board then divided Victoria into 24 Fire Control Regions and appointed 17 Regional Officers, but the organisation had very rocky first beginnings. All the existing urban and rural brigades were invited to join the new CFA... most did... some reluctantly... but nobody seemed particularly happy with the new arrangements. Some of the rural brigades were so incensed they proposed an alliance with the Commission rather than ceding autonomy to the newly formed CFA.

Maybe to appease the rival factions, the new CFA Board initially appointed two Chief Officers, with Alexander McPherson representing the urban brigades and Charles Alfred Daw for the rural brigades. McPherson retired at the end of June 1950, leaving Daw as the sole Chief Officer of the CFA.

By the time of the creation of the CFA in 1944 the Forests Commission had, to some extent, been supporting 768 Bush Fire Brigades with 35,000 volunteer members and £100,000 worth of equipment, which then transferred over to the new organisation.

The CFA then took responsibility for fire suppression on "Country Victoria" leaving the Forests Commission to focus on the public land estate such as State forest and National Parks which amounted for the remaining one third of the State.

The legislation also required that each country municipality appoint a "Proper Officer" empowered to permit lighting of fires during the proclaimed summer period and to order removal of fire hazards.

A major revision in the legislation with new consolidated Forests Act 1958 and Country Fire Authority Act 1958 clearly enshrined the role of the two agencies and the Chief Fire Officers into complementary legislation.

The CFA operates under the Country Fire Authority Act 1958 (No. 6228), as amended, and its regulations. The Act has been amended many times since its initial establishment, most recently in September 2015.

== Funding ==
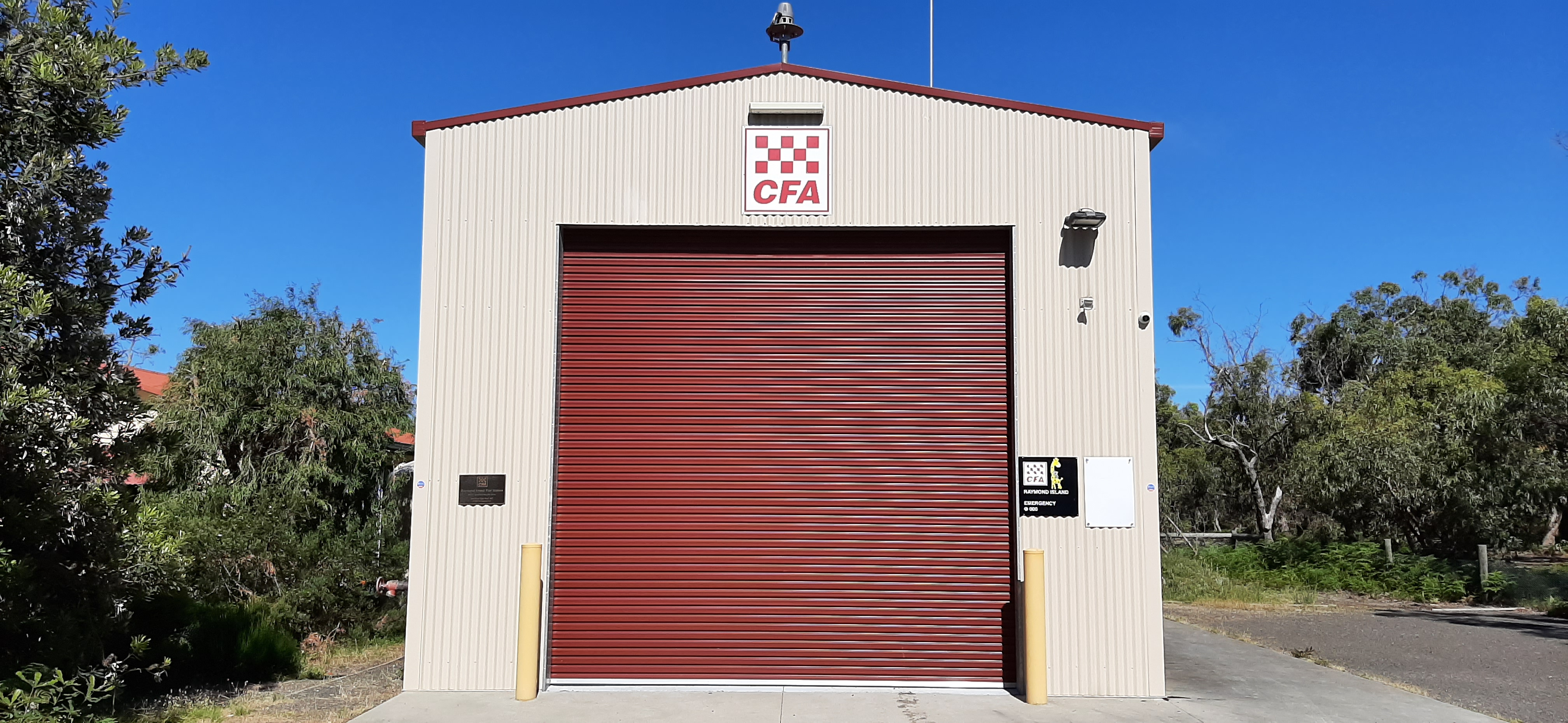
The CFA station on Raymond Island, Victoria

Since July 2013, fire services in Victoria have been funded by a fire service property levy on council rates. The CFA budgeted income for 2013–14 was $473m, of which $448m was provided by state government contributions, and $25m was internally generated (fees and charges, interest, donations, and sales of goods and services).

Additional government funding can be provided for specific staffing or training improvements, major works, or during long-duration incidents. The CFA also receives some funding from the provision of goods and services to external bodies, including Fire Equipment Maintenance (FEM). Individual brigades receive further funds from local councils, from their own fundraising activities and through donations from the community. Brigades may invest money to serve as an interest-earning vehicle, providing financial security against fiscal downturns. Some fire brigades hold large amounts of community funds to cover costs not met by CFA. These costs might include, but are not limited exclusively to, additional firefighting equipment, maintenance, improving or replacing facilities (including fire stations) and brigade-owned vehicles. Groups and brigades have also worked together with district support staff to provide financial or practical support to brigades and groups in need.

== CFA structure ==
The Country Fire Authority is established under the Country Fire Authority Act 1958 (most recently amended in September 2015). The Authority is controlled by a board, and falls under the portfolio of Victorian Legislative Assembly Member, The Honourable Lisa Neville, the Minister for Emergency Services since 29 November 2018.

At 1 October 2018, CFA personnel included 34,597 volunteer firefighters, 1358 career firefighters, and 1466 administrative, instructional and supporting paid staff.

The Authority is controlled by a 9-member board, which includes a chairperson and deputy chairperson.

CFA's current CEO is Greg Leach ASFM.

CFA's current Chief Officer is Jason Heffernan.

History of Chief Officers

· Alex McPherson (Urban) 2 April 1945 to 30 June 1950

· Charlie Daw (Rural) 2 April 1945 to 30 June 1950

· Charlie Daw (Rural & Acting Urban) 1 July 1950 to 15 March 1953

· Charlie Daw 16 March 1953 to 18 March 1961

· Alex Larkins 26 June 1961 to 20 August 1966

· Arthur Pitfield 21 August 1966 to 6 July 1975

· Clarrie Howe 7 July 1975 to 22 August 1980

· Ron Orchard 23 August 1980 to 10 June 1985

· Brian Potter 10 June 1985 to 10 November 1991

· Harry Rothsay 7 October 1991 to August 1994

· Arthur Farn 18 June 1994 to 9 October 1995

· Trevor Roche 23 October 1995 to 22 June 2001

· Russell Rees 6 August 2001 to 24 June 2010

· Euan Ferguson 15 November 2010 to 12 November 2015

· Joe Buffone 9 November 2015 to 30 June 2016

· Steve Warrington 1 July 2016 to 30 June 2020

· Jason Heffernan 1 November 2020 – Current

=== Regions and districts ===
The CFA field of operations in Victoria covers an area of more than 150,000 square kilometres and a population of 3.3 million people. It divides its operations into 5 regions, which are then subdivided into 21 districts. Each District comprises Groups of Fire Brigades. The CFA regions are:

- Loddon Mallee Region (North West)—districts 2, 14, 18 & 20
- Grampians Region (West)—districts 15, 16 & 17
- Barwon South-West Region (South West)—districts 4, 5, 6 & 7
- Hume Region (North East)—districts 12, 13, 22, 23 & 24
- Gippsland Region (South East)—districts 8, 9, 10, 11 & 27.

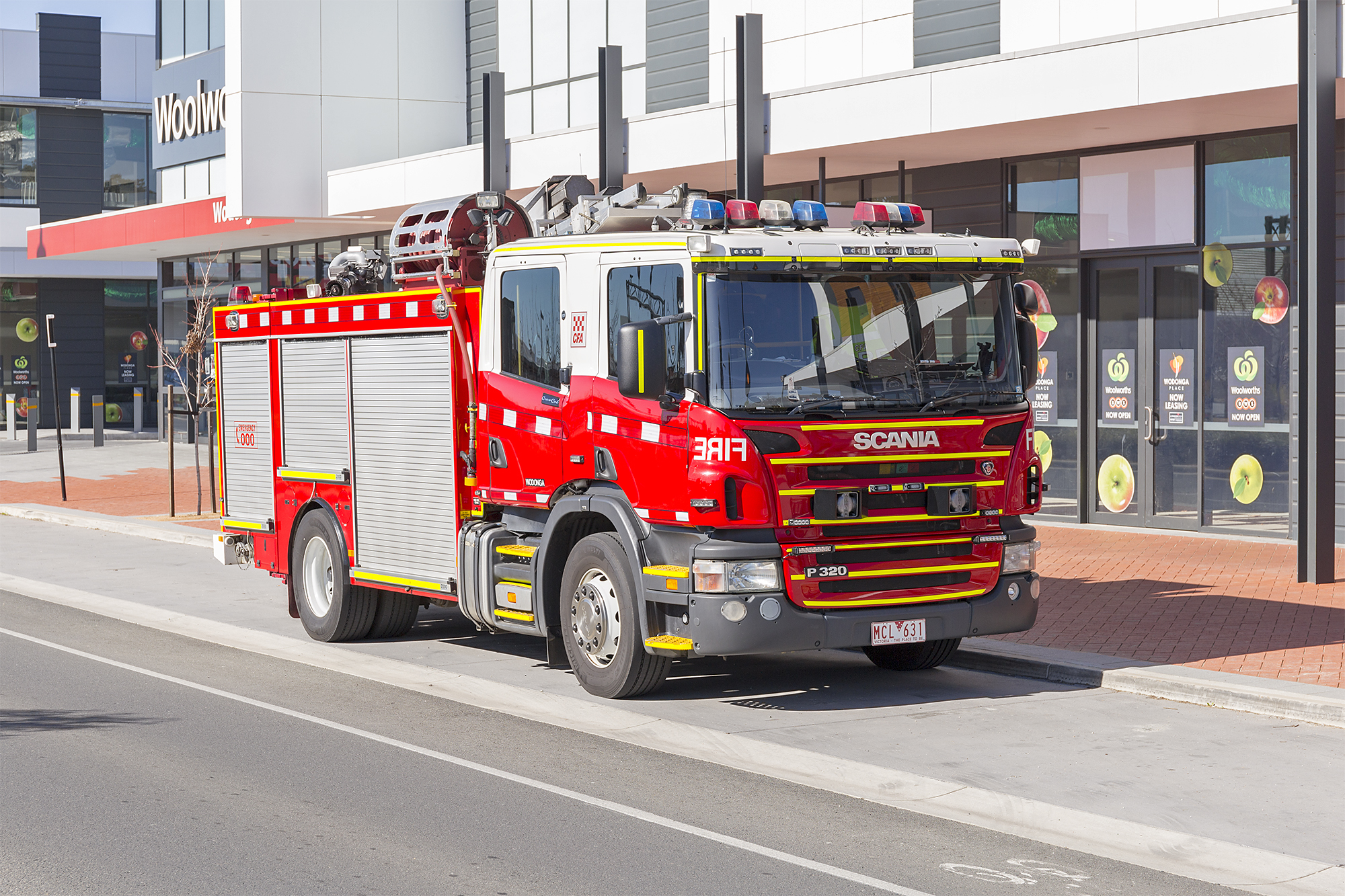
Wodonga CFA Scania Heavy Pumper. This particular pumper was transferred to Fire Rescue Victoria as part of the 2020 merger of Metropolitan Fire Brigade and career CFA staff.

=== Fire brigades and resources ===
CFA resources include 1,220 brigades, of which 941 are rural volunteer brigades, 204 urban volunteer brigades, 37 integrated brigades (stations staffed by career firefighters and volunteer firefighters), 23 forest industry brigades, and 17 coast guard brigades.

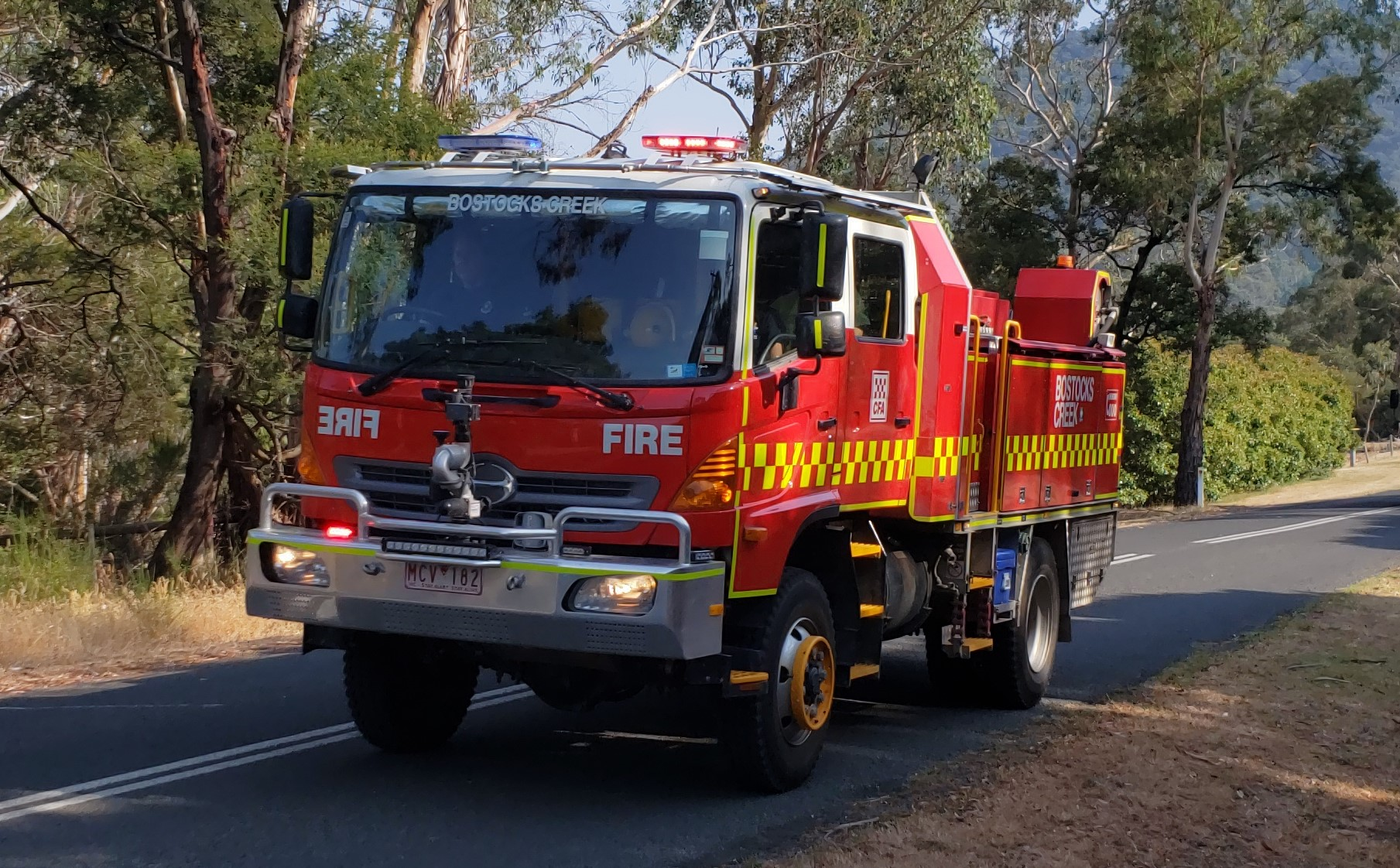
Rural tanker

CFA operates more than 4,000 vehicles, including over 2,000 4WD tankers, 264 pumpers, 28 rescue tenders, 16 hazmat vehicles plus numerous other vehicles including communications vans, lighting trucks, command and transport vehicles. This fleet is supplemented by more than 1,400 brigade-owned vehicles. Brigade-owned vehicles are paid for by local communities, sometimes with the assistance of government grants.

Some of these Appliances include trucks from Light Tankers, to Ultra Heavy Tankers. These new Ultra Heavy’s hold up to 10,000l, but only 9,000l can be used. Some include tankers up to 30 years old.

The state government also lease a large fleet of firefighting aircraft to assist brigades throughout the busy Summer fire season. The fleet comprises rotary and fixed wing aircraft, from small single-engined planes up to Very Large Aerial Tankers, based on commercial passenger jets. These aircraft are shared with other fire and emergency agencies such as DELWP.

The CFA has 1,200 base radios, 5,800 vehicle radios, 3,000 hand held radios, 35,000 EAS pagers, 58 satellite terminals and 10,700 pre-conference telephone interceptors.

=== Coast guard brigades ===
In 2005, the CFA signed a Memorandum of Understanding with the Australian Volunteer Coast Guard to establish CFA coast guard brigades. Under the MoU, all Victorian coast guard vessels will have CFA radios installed, EAS (Emergency Alerting System) pagers as used by the CFA as well as basic firefighting tools including a small pump and hoses. Additionally all coast guard members are to receive basic CFA firefighting training and some land-based brigades will receive marine firefighting training.

=== Fire Medical Response ===
On the 27th of November 2024 the Fire Medical Response (FMR) program was launched with an initial 9 Brigades taking part. The new Fire Medical Response program is a joint initiative between CFA and Ambulance Victoria that will see CFA brigades dispatched simultaneously to cardiac arrests with the nearest ambulance. The program has since expanded to approximately 50 brigades.

Brigades that are part of the FMR program include but not limited to:

- Alexandra
- Ararat
- Bacchus Marsh
- Bairnsdale
- Bannockburn
- Beechworth
- Benalla
- Berwick
- Broadford
- Bunyip
- Castlemaine
- Churchill
- Colac
- Creswick
- Drouin
- Echuca
- Edithvale (Also an EMR Brigade)
- Emerald
- Hamilton
- Hastings
- Horsham
- Huntly
- Inverloch
- Kilmore
- Kyabram
- Kyneton
- Lakes Entrance
- Mount Evelyn
- Numurkah
- Phillip Island
- Sale
- Somerville
- Sorrento
- Stawell
- Stratford
- Swan Hill
- Torquay
- Whittlesea
- Wonthaggi
- Yarra Junction
- Yarrawonga

=== Communications ===
In Victoria, Triple Zero Victoria (TZV) provides dispatch and call-taking services for Police, Ambulance, State Emergency Service and both rural and metropolitan fire services. TZV operates over three sites, located in Williams Landing, Burwood East, and Mount Helen (Ballarat).

Many TZV practices and protocols are standardised across all emergency services, allowing all agencies to utilise the same computer network. This enables complete and instantaneous information sharing between emergency services. ESTA is also responsible for Victoria's State Emergency Service call-taking and dispatch for non-life-threatening storm damage or flooding via 132 500.

When a caller dials 000 for emergency response within Victoria, an operator will connect them to the relevant TZV facility, where call-takers collect information from the caller for entry into the Computer Aided Dispatch (CAD) system. Using this information, a dispatcher will respond the appropriate emergency resources. Services are often already being notified by the dispatcher while the call-taker is still obtaining further information or giving advice, such as guiding the caller through CPR (Cardiopulmonary resuscitation).

When TZV is notified of an incident, they send an emergency message via pager to firefighters. While this is usually the result of a call to 000, brigades or appliances may also be dispatched by other agencies such as Victoria Police or Ambulance Victoria, or at the request of an Incident Controller on scene. Brigades are dispatched based on various factors including the time of day, location and type of fire or incident. Although each fire brigade has a primary response area, support brigades are often dispatched to ensure a prompt response. Specialist vehicles may also be dispatched, especially for incidents such as for road accident rescue or large structural fires where the response is anticipated.

=== Fire districts ===
Victoria is divided into nine fire districts:

- Mallee
- Wimmera
- South West
- Northern Country
- North Central
- Central
- North East
- East Gippsland
- West and South Gippsland.

The CFA announces fire danger ratings, total fire ban declarations and fire restrictions, which apply to all municipalities within a fire district:

- The Fire Danger Ratings are forecast for four days.
- A Total Fire Ban is declared for each district by CFA on days when fires are likely to spread rapidly and could be difficult to control, and means that no fires can be lit for the declared district for that day—irrespective of the Fire Restriction status for a given municipality.
- Fire Restrictions come into force when entered into the Government Gazette.

=== Operational Ranks ===
CFA provides separate rank structures to cater for volunteer firefighters and career staff. Not all CFA positions are listed.

Administrative Ranks for Volunteer Firefighters	Helmet Insignia	Epaulette	HardBoard
Group Officer			N/A
Deputy Group Officer			N/A
Operational Ranks for Volunteer Firefighters	Helmet Insignia	Epaulette	HardBoard
Captain			
1st Lieutenant			
2nd to 6th Lieutenant			N/A
Firefighter			N/A

=== Fire Services Reform ===
On 19 May 2017, Premier Daniel Andrews and Minister for Emergency Services James Merlino proposed changes to the Victorian fire services. These changes include rationalisation and realignment of fire district boundaries as well as changes to the structure of fire fighting services within the State of Victoria.

These came into effect on 1 July 2020. CFA Staff from the rank of Assistant Chief Fire Officer and below moved from CFA to Fire Rescue Victoria. They would be seconded back to CFA in order to fulfil operational roles as Commanders and ACFOs. All CFA Brigades are now 100% volunteer.

== Training ==
"CFA's regional training campuses allow firefighters to experience operational scenarios, including live fires, in a safe, controlled and realistic environment. This is essential in developing and maintaining skills needed to fulfil the mission of protecting lives and property in Victorian communities."

The CFA operates seven Regional Training Campuses:

- Bangholme
- Wangaratta
- Longerenong
- Penshurst
- Huntly
- West Sale
- Sunraysia
- Central Highlands

In May 2017, CFA announced the construction of a new training facility near the town of Ballan, about 70 kilometres West of Melbourne. The new Ballan training grounds will be utilised predominantly by CFA's volunteer firefighters,

CFA's volunteer firefighters must complete Wildfire "General Firefighter" course, prior to being deemed competent to respond to fire and emergency calls. Progression to Officer occurs following election by fellow Volunteer Fire Brigade members every 2 years.

== Major incidents ==
The CFA has been involved in a number of major fires over the years where lives have been lost, including:

- The Ash Wednesday bushfires in 1983
- The Linton Bushfire in 1998
- The Eastern Victorian alpine bushfires in 2003
- The Eastern Victoria Great Divide bushfires in 2007
- The Black Saturday bushfires in 2009
- The Black Summer bushfires in 2019 to 2020

CFA deployments have also assisted during interstate fires such as the 2001–2002 Black Christmas bushfires in Sydney and the 2003 Canberra bushfires. In late 2015 and early 2022, CFA firefighters were deployed to the South Australian fires, in support of CFS and SAFS crews. During February and March 2016, hundreds of CFA volunteer firefighters and some career firefighters were deployed across Bass Strait, where they assisted Tasmanian firefighters working on the North West Tasmanian fires. Many CFA firefighting, communications and specialist vehicles were ferried over as well. More recently (2022) CFA volunteer firefighters have been deployed to the basin areas along the Murray River, reaching into NSW during flooding events.

== Activities ==
The CFA is involved in responding to non-fire incidents, in addition to firefighting operations. CFA has a leading role in prevention, preparedness, response and recovery of fires and other incidents. The CFA is responsible for combatting all fires on private land in Victoria outside of the Metropolitan Fire District, including Structure Fires and Bushfires. The CFA has a shared responsibility for rescues with the Victorian State Emergency Service and the FRV. In addition to response activities, CFA members also run prevention programs such as Fire Ready Victoria and Fire Safe Kids. Fire Safe Kids is an education program for Pre-Primary and Primary School students which teaches Fire Safety and the Role of Firefighters in the Community.

CFA is responsible, along with other Victorian emergency services, for some specialist response functions, including:

- Confined Space Rescue
- Trench Rescue
- High Angle Rescue
- Low Angle Rescue
- Road Accident Rescue
- Industrial Rescue
- Urban Search and Rescue (USAR)
- Rural Search and Rescue (RSAR)
- Technical Large Animal Rescue (TLAR)
- Aviation Response
- Marine Response
- Hazardous Materials Response
- Chemical, Biological, Radiological (CBR) Response
- LPG Response
- Emergency Medical Response (EMR)
  Thanks to a $46.7 million contribution by the State Labor Government, the EMR program has been expanded to all Integrated CFA Fire Stations. Paid firefighters are EMR trained to respond to medical emergencies, improving the chance of the patient's survival. The EMR program sees paid firefighters and paramedics dispatched at the same time to assist in life-threatening medical emergencies." Three Volunteer Brigades, namely Berwick, Edithvale and Whittlesea, are also "EMR Qualified" and may be called upon to assist Ambulance Victoria.
- Fire Medical Response (FMR)

== Representative Bodies ==
Volunteer Fire Brigades Victoria (VFBV) was established under the Country Fire Authority Act 1958 to represent Volunteer Fire Brigades, working with CFA and the Victorian Government to ensure ongoing commitment to the Volunteer Charter. The Victorian Branch of the United Firefighters Union of Australia (UFU) was established on 22 January 1911 and represents paid firefighters throughout Victoria. Volunteer firefighters may join the UFU as associate members.
In November 2016, a third representative body came into being. The Victorian Volunteer Firefighters Association (VVFA) was established 4 October 2016, and represents individual volunteer firefighters, a move stemming from recognition that VFBV focus on brigades as a whole, rather than on individual volunteer members. Most CFA Volunteer Brigades are members of VFBV. A small minority have chosen to stay as non-members of VFBV.

=== Championships ===
VFBV organise, promote and conduct the Urban and Rural State Fire Brigade Championships. In this series of sporting events, Volunteer brigades compete in challenges based on past and (modified) current firefighting practices. In 2019, the Rural State Championships will be held at Bendigo, on 6 and 7 April. The 2019 State Junior Championships will be held at Kerang, on 23 and 24 February. The upcoming State Urban Championships are going to be in Bendigo from 9 to 11 March 2019.

== See also ==
- Fire Rescue Victoria
- New South Wales Rural Fire Service
- South Australian Country Fire Service
- Fire and Rescue New South Wales
- National Council for Fire & Emergency Services
- CFA Training College, Fiskville
