= Victoria State Emergency Service =

Volunteer emergency service organisation in Australia

- Seal

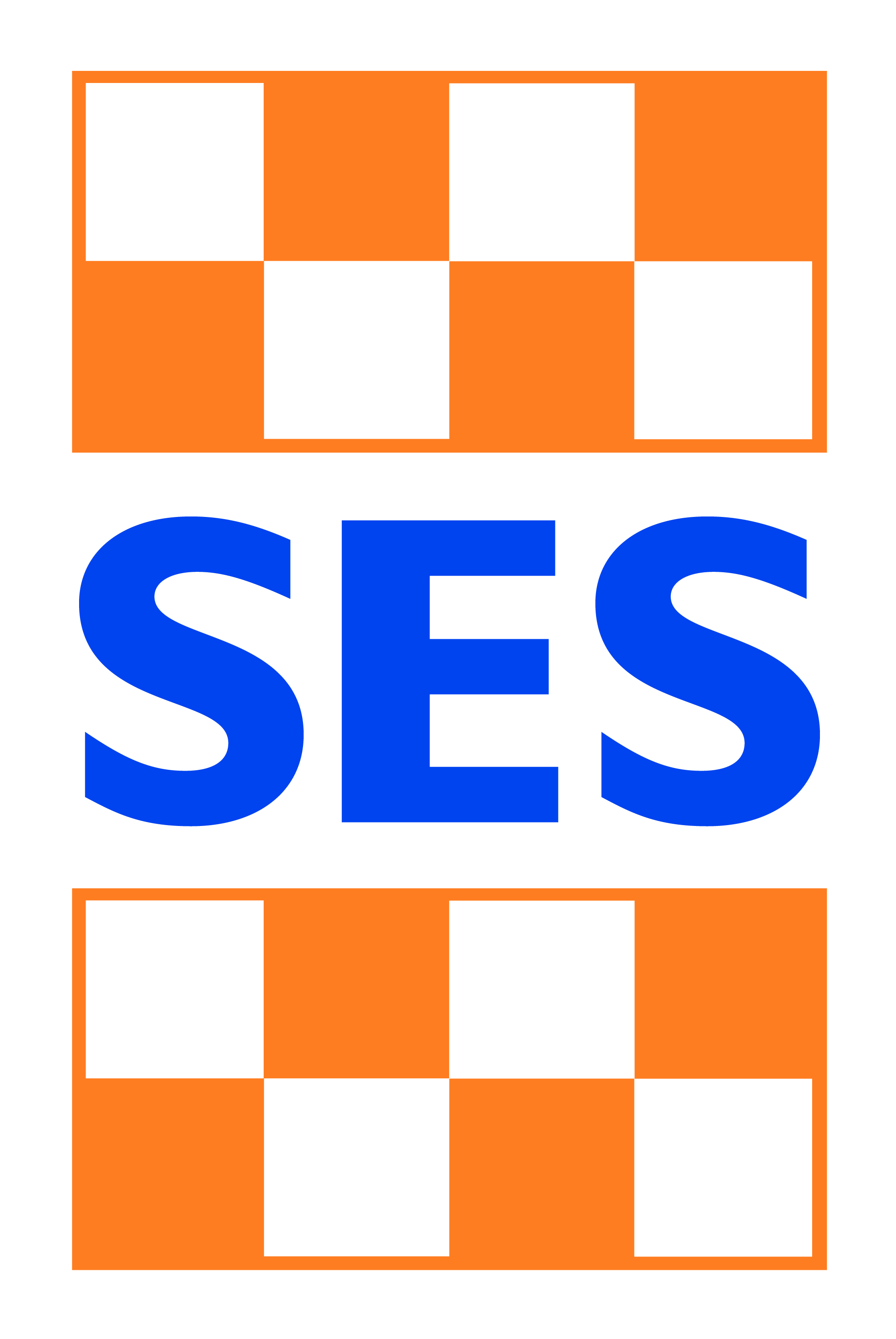
- Corporate Logo

- Flag

Agency overview
- Formed: 1975
- Preceding agency: Civil Defence Organisation
- Jurisdiction: Victoria
- Headquarters: 168 Sturt Street, Southbank, Victoria, Australia
- Employees: Paid and Voluntary; Volunteers 5,000; Staff 200
- Agency executives: Robert Purcell, Chief Executive Officer; Alistair Drayton, Acting Chief Officer Operations; Kate White, Interim Chief Executive Officer (On Leave); Silivia Silverii, Interim Executive Director Community & Corporate Services; Asad Zafar, Interim Chief Information Officer; Debbie Mann, Executive Director, People, Safety & Wellbeing
- Website: ses.vic.gov.au

The Victoria State Emergency Service (VICSES) is a volunteer-based civil defence organisation that responds to natural and man-made disasters, and works to ensure the safety of local communities in Victoria, Australia. Each state and territory has its own independent State Emergency Service (SES) that serves as an auxiliary force to support the work of other agencies, such as police and fire brigades. While VICSES is largely responsible for disaster response in Victoria, during large-scale crises it is not uncommon that assistance be sought from other states.

VICSES is the lead agency for responding to floods, storms, landslides, tsunamis, earthquakes, and incidents involving building damage. It also operates the largest network of road rescue units in Australia, and to that end, is one of the largest in the world.

VICSES also provides assistance to other emergency agencies such as Victoria Police, Ambulance Victoria, the Country Fire Authority (CFA), Fire Rescue Victoria (FRV), and to municipal councils in support of their emergency management plans.

There are more than 5,000 volunteers and 220 employees spread across 155 units.

== Responsibilities ==
=== Control Agency ===
- Storm
- Flood
- Tsunami
- Earthquake
- Landslide
- incidents involving building damage
- rescue incidents involving rail, aircraft and industrial (as per State Road Crash Rescue Arrangements 2023)

=== Support agency ===
- Country Fire Authority (CFA)
- Victoria Police (VICPOL)
- Fire Rescue Victoria (FRV) [Previously known as the Metropolitan Fire Brigade (MFB)]
- Ambulance Victoria (AV)
- Department of Energy, Environment and Climate Action (DEECA)

== Activities ==
In addition to its control agency functions, VICSES has a shared responsibility for rescues with the CFA and FRV.

VICSES along with other emergency services in Victoria, provide specialist response functions including:

- Road Rescue
- High Angle Rescue
- Industrial Rescue
- Urban Search and Rescue (USAR)
- Search and Rescue (SAR)
- Alpine Search and Rescue (ASAR)
- Land Based Swift Water Rescue (LBSWR)
- Marine Search and Rescue (MSAR)
- General Land Rescue

VICSES is also called upon to assist other agencies with unique tasks, some include:

- Victoria Police
  - Crime scene preservation
  - Evidence search
  - General assistance (lighting, temporary power, ladders, etc.).
- Ambulance Victoria
  - Assist with patient carry-outs
  - Assist paramedics in difficult terrain (4WD/ATV/BOAT)
- Country Fire Authority
  - Staging area management
  - Incident Management
- Environmental Protection Authority
  - Deployment of air quality monitoring equipment

== Regions ==
VICSES is broken into two regions that cover the state of Victoria. The SES Units are supported by Unit Support Teams (UST) with career personnel.

- East Region
  - Unit Support Teams in Bayside, Eastern Metro, East Gippsland, Goulburn Broken, North East, Southern Metro, West Gippsland
- West Region
  - Unit Support Teams in Barwon, Loddon, Mallee, Mid West, North West Metro, South West, Wimmera

== Ranks ==
=== Volunteer Insignia ===
| Section Leader | Deputy Controller | Unit Controller |

=== Staff Insignia ===
| Operations Trainer | Operations Assistant | Operations Officer | Operations Manager | Assistant Chief Officer | Deputy Chief Officer | Chief Officer |

== Vehicles, Trailers & Other Assets ==
=== Cars ===
==== Passenger Vehicles ====
Cars include a mixture of Ford, Holden, Subaru, Kia and Toyota

Mini-Van

==== Four Wheel Drives ====
Mixture of Nissan Patrol, Navara, Pathfinder, Ford Rangers, Everest & Toyota Hilux

=== Light Rescue ===
Mixture of chassis Ford, Mercedes & Iveco

=== Medium Rescue ===
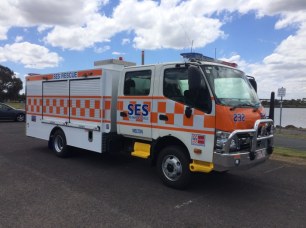
SES medium Rescue 2WD Truck

==== Medium Rescue (2WD) ====
| Chssis | Hino 300 Series, 921 Crew Cab |
| GVM | 8.5t |
| Engine | 5.1L Turbocharged Diesel |
| Transmission | 6 Speed Automatic |
| Seating | 6 Seats |
| Drive | 4x2 rear wheel, 100L fuel tank capacity |
| Safety | Dual SRS Airbags, ABS Brakes with Electronic Brakeforce Distribution (EBD). |

Equipment Body:

- 5 large and 3 smaller lockers, with 3 x shadow boards for the storage of tools, 5 x sliding shelves and,
- 4 x slide and tilt shelves (including LED locker lighting).
- Light mast (up to 7.5m from ground) with 4 x 100W 24V LED lights (output 10,479 Lm per light).
- External work lights at the mid point of the body, controlled by the Hazard SLIC panel.
- Martin power supply system capacity of 8 kVA with 8 x 10A GPO’s.
- Compressed air system delivering 10 Cubic Feet per Minute (CFM) at 116psi.
- Bulbar fitted with HID driving lights.
- No tow bar fitted.

Equipment Capabilities:

- Up to 1,000kg of tools and equipment
- Multi purpose truck, i.e. capacity for storm and flood or RCR equipment.

Licence Requirements:

- Light Rigid Licence

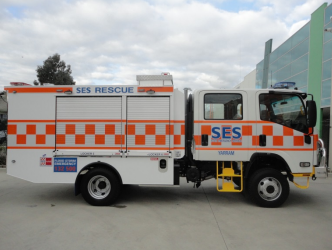
SES Medium Rescue 4WD Truck

==== Medium Rescue (4WD) ====
| Chassis | Isuzu NPS 75/155 4WD Crew Cab |
| GVM | 7.5t |
| Engine | 5.0L Diesel Turbocharged |
| Transmission | 5 speed Automated Manual |
| Seating | 7 Seats |
| Drive | Electric control part time 4WD with dual range transfer case, limited slip rear differential, 140 Litre fuel tank capacity |
| Safety | Incl. Driver and passenger air bags, ABS braking |

Equipment Body:

- 5 large and 3 smaller lockers, with 3 x shadow boards for the storage of tools, 5 x sliding shelves and,
- 4 x slide and tilt shelves (including LED locker lighting).
- Light mast (up to 7.5m from ground) with 4 x 24V LED lights.
- External work lights at the mid point of the body, controlled by the Hazard SLIC panel.
- Martin power supply system – capacity of 8 kVA with 8 x 10A GPO’s.
- Compressed air system delivering 10 Cubic Feet per Minute (CFM) at 116psi.
- Bulbar fitted with 15,000lb, 24v winch & HID driving lights
- No tow bar fitted.

Equipment Capabilities:

- Up to 1,000kg of tools and equipment
- Multi purpose truck, i.e. capacity for RAIR, Storm and Flood equipment.

Licence Requirements:

- Light Rigid Licence

=== Heavy Rescue ===
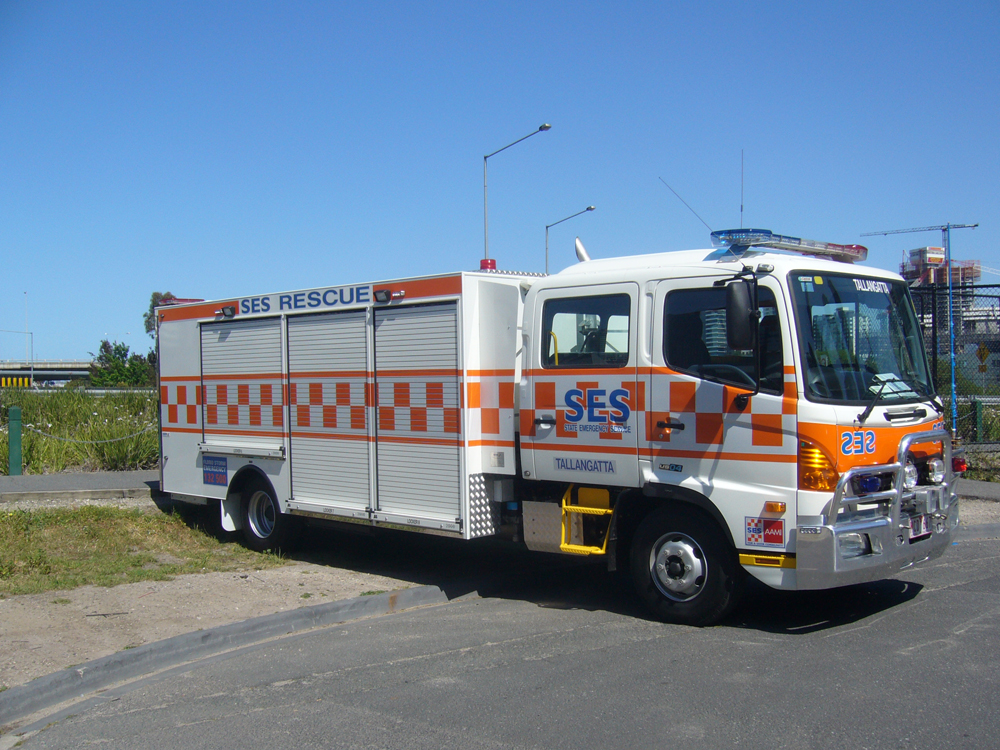
SES Heavy Rescue

==== Heavy Rescue Truck (2WD) ====
| Chassis | Hino 500, FD 1124 Crew Cab |
| GVM | 11t |
| Engine | 6.4L Diesel Turbocharged |
| Transmission | Automatic |
| Seating | 7 Seats |
| Drive | Rear wheel, 200L fuel tank capacity |
| Safety | ABS Brakes with ASR, electric and heated mirrors and drivers SRS airbag |

Equipment Body:

- 7 large and 1 smaller lockers, with 3 x shadow boards for the storage of tools, 5 x sliding shelves and
- 8 x fixed shelving, 4 x slide and tilt shelves (including locker lighting).
- Light mast (up to 7.5m from ground) with 4 x 24v LED lights.
- External work lights at the mid point of the body, controlled by the Hazard SLIC panel.
- Martin power supply of 8kVA with 8 x 10A GPO.
- Compressed air system delivering 15 cubic feet per minute (CFM) at 130psi.
- Bull bar fitted with HID driving lights
- No tow bar fitted

Equipment Capabilities:

- Up to 2,000kg of tools and equipment
- RAIR purpose truck, i.e. capacity RAIR and storm or flood equipment.

Licence Requirements:

- Medium Rigid Licence

=== Boats ===
IRB's

=== Trailers ===
==== Lighting Towers ====
Genie AL6-6000

- 8.40 m extended mast height
- 2.45 m long (drawbar retracted)
- Kubota D1403 diesel10.7 kW @1500rpm

AllightSykes URBAN MLLED200K-9AC-K

- 9-meter mast design
- LED's 4 x 500 watt
- 200,000 lumens
- Kubota D905 Diesel Engine
- 100km/h Wind Speed Rated

== Units ==
=== Central Region (Including North West Metro and South) ===
| Unit | Location | Other Links | Rescue(s) | General Rescue(s) | Support(s) | Other | Special Skill Set | Notes |
|---|---|---|---|---|---|---|---|---|
| Brimbank | Stadium Dr, Keilor Park VIC 3042 Google Maps | Facebook | | | | | | |
| Central East RHQ Unit | | | | | | | | |
| Central West RHQ Unit | | | | | | | | |
| Chelsea | 13 Ashley Park Drive, Chelsea Heights VIC 3196 Google Maps | Website; Facebook; Instagram | 1 | 2 | 2 – Four-Wheel Drives | 2 – Boats; 1 – Lighting Trailer; 1 – Pump Trailer; 1 – Sand Bag Trailer; 1 – General Purpose Trailer | Boat Rescue; Land Based Swift Water Rescue; Air Observer | Chelsea SES Unit's history can be traced back to 1953 making it one of the longest, continuous serving units assisting the community This unit is Junior Accredited allowing the unit to train children between the ages of 16–17 years old |
| Craigieburn | 151A Craigieburn Rd, Craigieburn VIC 3064 Google Maps | Facebook | | | | | | |
| Emerald | Old Gembrook Rd, Emerald VIC 3782 Google Maps | | | | | | | |
| Essendon | 9 Rutherford St, Aberfeldie VIC 3039 Google Maps | Facebook | | | | Boat Rescue | Land Based Swift Water Rescue | |
| Fawkner | 1161 Sydney Rd, Hadfield VIC 3046 Google Maps | Facebook | | 2 | 1 – General Rescue Support | 2 – Support 4WD; 1 – Lighting Trailer; 1 – Crime Scene Support Trailer; 1 – General Purpose Trailer | Land Based Swift Water Rescue; Air Observer | Formerly Broadmeadows Unit, name changed on 12 September 2022 due to relocation |
| Footscray | 95 Sunshine Road, West Footscray VIC 3012 (Entry via Indwe Street gate) Google Maps | Facebook | | 2 | 2 | 2 Rescue Boats; 1 Box Trailer | Boat Rescue | Formed on 8 February 1962 |
| Frankston | 6 McMannis Way, Seaford VIC 3198 Google Maps | Website; Facebook | 3 | 0 | 3 – Four-Wheel Drives; 1 – Mini-bus; 2 – Boats | | Road Crash Rescue; Boat Rescue | This unit is Junior Accredited allowing the unit to train children between the ages of 16–17 years old |
| Glen Eira | 92 Bignell Rd, Bentleigh East VIC 3165 Google Maps | Facebook | 1 | 1 | 2 – Four-Wheel Drives | 1 – Lighting Trailer | | Formerly Oakleigh Unit, name changed on 30 June 2014 |
| Greater Dandenong | 42 Mills Rd, Dandenong VIC 3175 Google Maps | Facebook | | | | | | Formerly Springvale Unit, name changed on 30 June 2014 |
| Hastings | Frankston–Flinders Rd, Hastings VIC 3915 Google Maps | | | | | | | |
| Healesville | 18 Argoon Rd, Healesville VIC 3777 Google Maps | | | | | | | |
| Heidelberg | 446 Waterdale Rd, Heidelberg Heights VIC 3081 | Facebook; Website | | 1 – Medium General Rescue (Isuzu) – currently at Ararat; 1 – Light Rescue (Iveco) | 1 – Hilux crew cab 1 – Nissan Patrol; 1 – Storm Trailer; 1 – General Purpose trailer Search and Rescue Bike Squad x six bikes | 1 x Traverse rescue Mule | | Formerly Northcote Unit, name changed on 12 September 2022 |
| Hobsons Bay | | Facebook | | | | | | Formerly Altona Unit, name changed on 30 June 2014 |
| Knox | | Facebook | | | | | | |
| Lilydale | | | | | | | | |
| Malvern | | Facebook | | | | | | |
| Manningham | | | | | | | | Formerly Doncaster Unit, name changed on 30 June 2014 |
| Maroondah | | Facebook | | | | | | Formerly Croydon Unit, name changed on 30 June 2014 |
| Melton | | Facebook | | | | | | |
| Monash | | Facebook | | | | | | Formerly Waverley Unit, name changed on 30 June 2014 |
| Moorabbin | | Facebook | | | | | | |
| Narre Warren | | | | | | | | |
| Nillumbik | 58 Susan Street, Eltham VIC 3088 | Website; Facebook | 1 – RAIR Heavy Rescue | 1 – RAIR Rescue Support | 1 | 1 – Four-Wheel Drive Technical Rescue; 1 – Four-Wheel Drive Support; 1 x Lighting Trailer | Road Crash Rescue; Technical Rescue – Steep Angle Rope Rescue (multi-agency team with CFA); Air Search Observers; Land Based Swift Water Rescue; Urban Search and Rescue Category 1 | Formerly Eltham Unit, name changed on 30 June 2014 |
| Pakenham | | | | | | | | |
| Port Phillip | | | | | | | | Formerly St Kilda Unit, name changed on 30 June 2014 |
| Sorrento | | Facebook | | | | | | |
| Sunbury | | | | | | | | |
| Upper Yarra | | Facebook | | | | | | |
| Whitehorse | | Facebook | | | | | | Formerly Nunawading Unit, name changed on 30 June 2014 |
| Whittlesea | | | | | | | | |
| Wyndham | | | | | | | | |
| Wyndham West | | Facebook | | | | | | Was the 150th VICSES Unit Created and became operation on 14 July 2020, with 6 members |

=== Gippsland Region ===
| Unit | Location | Other Links | Notes |
|---|---|---|---|
| Gippsland Regional Support | | | |
| Bairnsdale | | | |
| Bendoc | | | |
| Bruthen | | | |
| Buchan | | | |
| Cann River | | | |
| Erica | | | |
| Foster | | | |
| Inverloch | | | |
| Leongatha | | | |
| Loch Sport | | | |
| Maffra | | | |
| Mallacoota | | | |
| Moe | | | |
| Morwell | | | |
| Orbost | | | |
| Phillip Island | | | |
| Rosedale | | | |
| Sale | | | |
| San Remo | | | |
| Stratford | | | |
| Tambo Valley | | | Formerly Swifts Creek Unit, name changed on 1 November 2018 |
| Warragul | | | |
| Wonthaggi | | | |
| Yarram | | | |

=== Grampians Region ===
| Unit | Location | Other Links | Notes |
|---|---|---|---|
| Ararat | | | |
| Bacchus Marsh | | | |
| Ballarat | | | |
| Dimboola | | | |
| Dunmunkle | | | Formerly known as Rupanyup Unit, name changed on 30 June 2014 |
| Edenhope | | | |
| Goroke | | | |
| Daylesford | | | Formerly Hepburn Shire Unit, name changed on 12 September 2022 |
| Horsham | | | |
| Kaniva | | | |
| Grampians Regional Support | | | |
| Nhill | | | |
| St Arnaud | | | |
| Stawell | | | |
| Warracknabeal | | | |

=== Hume Region ===
| Unit | Location | Other Links | Notes |
|---|---|---|---|
| Alexandra | | | |
| Beechworth | | | |
| Benalla | | | |
| Bright | | | |
| Chiltern | | | |
| Cobram | | | |
| Corryong | | | |
| Euroa | | | |
| Falls Creek | | | |
| Kilmore | | | |
| Kinglake | | | |
| Mansfield | | | |
| Marysville | | | |
| Mitta Mitta | | | |
| Murchison | | | |
| Myrtleford | | | |
| Numurkah | | | |
| Hume Regional Headquarters Unit | | | |
| Rutherglen | | | |
| Seymour | | | |
| Shepparton Search & Rescue Squad (Private) | | | |
| Tallangatta | | | |
| Tatura | 52 Martin St, Tatura VIC 3616 | https://www.facebook.com/taturases | |
| Wangaratta | | | |
| Wodonga | | | |
| Yackandandah | | | |
| Yarrawonga | | | |

=== Loddon Mallee Region ===
| Unit | Location | Other Links | Notes |
|---|---|---|---|
| Bendigo | 64 Adam Street, Golden Square VIC 3555 | | |
| Birchip | 89 Cumming Avenue, Birchip VIC 3483 | | |
| Castlemaine | 1 Scotts Ave, Castlemaine VIC 3450 | Google Maps; Facebook | |
| Dunolly | 51 Broadway, Dunolly VIC 3472 | | |
| Echuca | 290 High Street, Echuca VIC 3564 | | |
| Echuca-Moama Search & Rescue (Private) | | | |
| Gisborne | 33 Robertson Street, Gisborne VIC 3437 | | |
| Heathcote | 3/7 Wright Street, Heathcote VIC 3523 | | |
| Huntly | 608 Midland Highway, Huntly VIC 3551 | | |
| Kerang | 8 Tate Drive, Kerang VIC 3579 | | |
| Kyabram | 4 Kuhle Court, Kyabram VIC 3620 | | |
| Marong | 32 Cathcart Street, Marong VIC 3515 | | |
| Maryborough | 70 Burns Street, Maryborough VIC 3465 | | |
| Mildura | 70 Twelfth Street, Mildura VIC 3500 | | |
| Murrayville | 19 Poole Street, Murrayville VIC 3512 | | |
| North West Regional Support | 7 Rohs Road, East Bendigo VIC 3550 | | |
| Ouyen | 50 Farrell Street, Ouyen VIC 3490 | | |
| Robinvale | 59-61 McLennan Drive, Robinvale VIC 3549 | | |
| Rochester | 5 Victoria Street, Rochester VIC 3561 | | |
| Rushworth | 4 Barlow Avenue, Rushworth VIC 3612 | | |
| Swan Hill | 1 McAllister Road, Swan Hill VIC 3585 | | |
| Wedderburn | 2 Nardoo Court, Wedderburn VIC 3518 | | |
| Woodend | 26 Urqhart Street, Woodend VIC 3442 | | |
| Woomelang | 6509 Berriwillock-Woomelang Road, Woomelang VIC 3485 | | |
| Wycheproof | 69 Dempsey Street, Wycheproof VIC 3527 | | |

=== Barwon South West Region ===
| Unit | Location | Other Links | Rescue(s) | General Rescue(s) | Support(s) | Other | Special Skill Set | Notes |
|---|---|---|---|---|---|---|---|---|
| Balmoral | | | | | | | | |
| Bannockburn | | | | | | | | |
| Bellarine | | | | | | | | |
| Camperdown | | | | | | | | |
| Cobden | | | | | | | | |
| Colac | | | | | | | | |
| Corio | | | | | | | | |
| Dartmoor | | | | | | | | |
| Dunkeld | | | | | | | | |
| Geelong | | | | | | | | |
| Hamilton | 58–60 Shakespeare Street, Hamilton VIC 3300 | | 1 – Heavy Rescue | | 2 – Support 4WDs | 1 – Lighting Trailer; 1 – Rescue Boat; 1 – Storm Trailer; 1 – Litter Mule | Road Rescue; Rescue Boat; Swift Water Rescue – Land Based; Urban Search & Rescue – Cat 1 Incident Air Monitoring; Divisional Command Point | Founded on 9 December 1969, as the "Hamilton & District Civil Defence & Rescue Squad" |
| Heywood | | | | | | | | |
| Lismore | | | | | | | | |
| Lorne | | | | | | | | |
| Mortlake | | | | | | | | |
| Otway | | | | | | | | |
| Port Campbell | | | | | | | | |
| Port Fairy | | | | | | | | |
| Portland | | | | | | | | |
| Barwon South West Regional Support | | | | | | | | |
| South Barwon | | | | | | | | |
| Terang | | | | | | | | |
| Torquay | | | | | | | | |
| Warrnambool | | | | | | | | |
| Winchelsea | 325 Mousley Rd, Winchelsea VIC 3241 | Facebook | 1 – Medium Rescue | | 1 – Support 4WD | 1 – Lighting Trailer | Road Rescue | |

== Volunteers Association ==
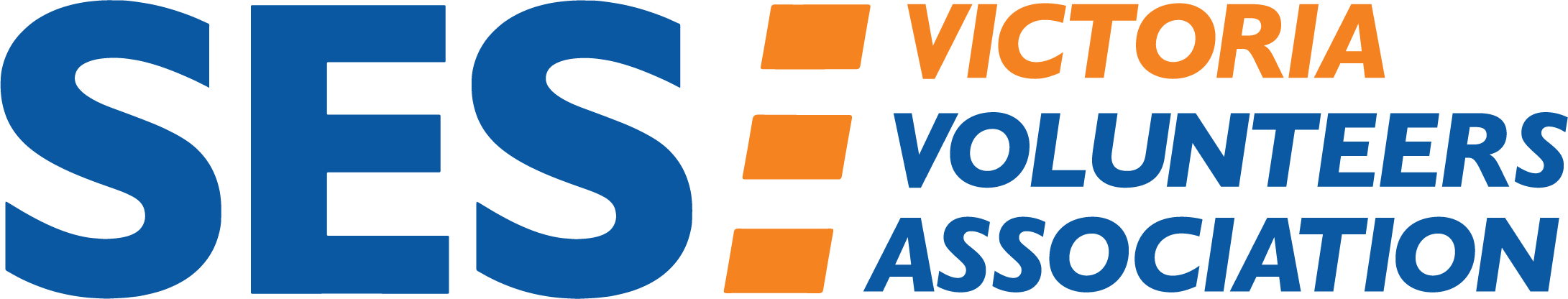
VICSESVA Corporate Logo

Volunteers and Units are represented by the Victoria State Emergency Service Volunteers Association (VICSESVA) which was formed in 1983.

The Association's role is to advocate for VICSES volunteers by raising issues that impact on skills, training, funding, equipment, ethics & safety. VICSESVA is a non-profit association run and managed by VICSES Volunteers.

== See also ==
- National Council for Fire & Emergency Services

Other States:

- (NSW) New South Wales State Emergency Service
- (QLD) Queensland State Emergency Service
- (SA) South Australian State Emergency Service
- (ACT) Australian Capital Territory State Emergency Service
- (WA) State Emergency Service of Western Australia
- (NT) Northern Territory Emergency Service
- (TAS) Tasmania State Emergency Service
