= South Australian Country Fire Service =

Volunteer fire service in South Australia

SA Country Fire Service
- CFS logo
- Established: 1976
- Location: South Australia
- Region served: 6
- Services: Control Agency for Fire, Rescue and Hazmat
- Members: 425 brigades; ~800 appliances
- Current CO: Brett Loughlin
- Staff: 190 paid staff
- Volunteers: ~13000
- Website: cfs.sa.gov.au

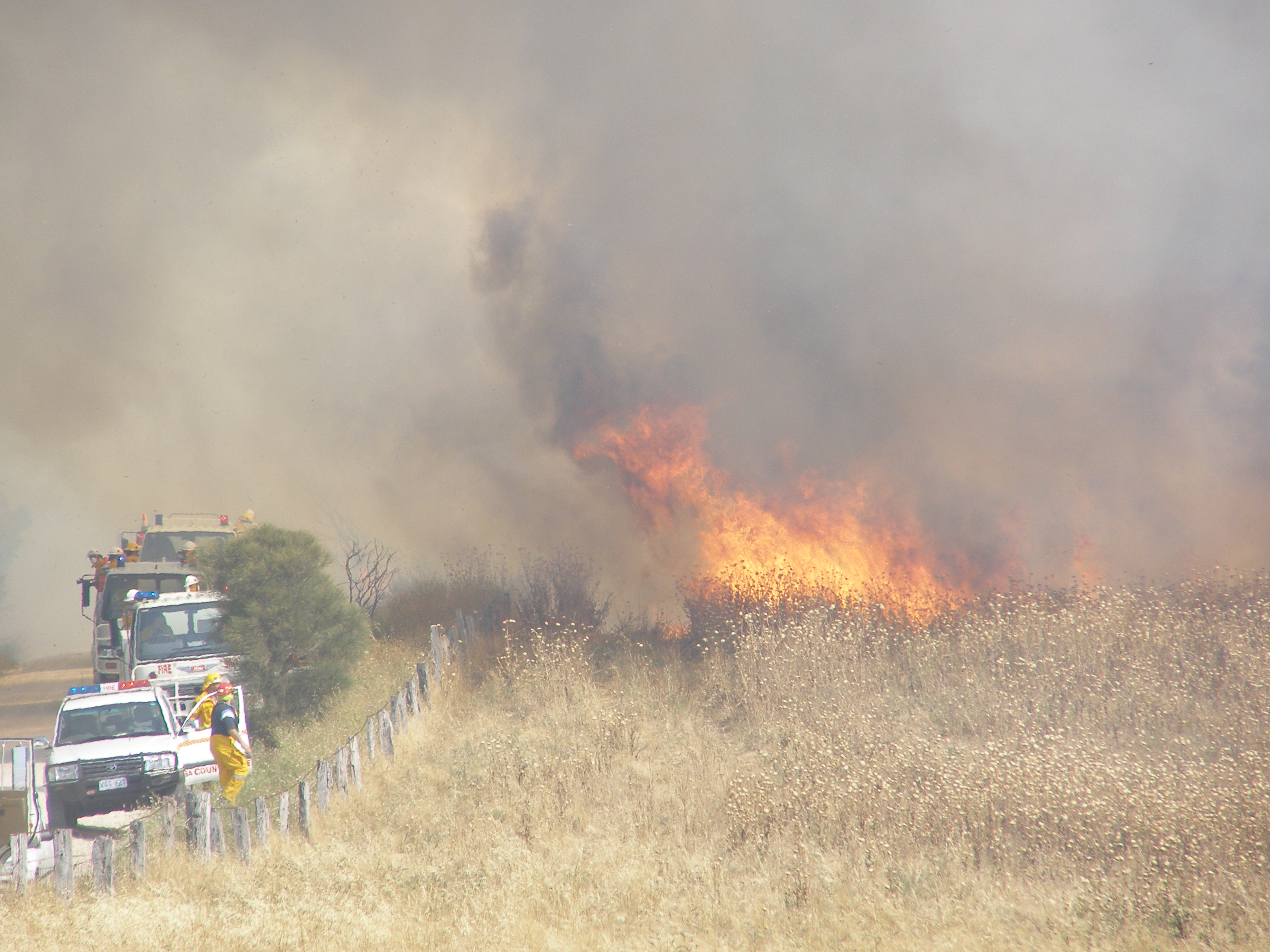
Grass fire at Willunga. January 2006

The South Australian Country Fire Service (SACFS, commonly abbreviated as CFS) is a volunteer-based fire and rescue organisation in the state of South Australia. The CFS has responsibility as the primary control agency for firefighting, rescues, hazardous materials and inland waterways in the country regions of South Australia. Its mission is "to protect life, property and the environment from fire and other emergencies whilst protecting and supporting our personnel and continuously improving".

Many parts of Australia are sparsely populated and at significant risk of bushfire. It would be prohibitively expensive for each Australian town or village to have a paid fire service (department). The compromise was to have government-funded equipment and training and volunteer firefighters to perform the duties of regular (salaried) firefighters. In South Australia, the name for the volunteer service is the CFS. Each state and territory has its own volunteer fire department, such as the Country Fire Authority in Victoria and the Rural Fire Service in New South Wales.

In the state capital of Adelaide and larger towns across South Australia, a conventional full-time service exists, the South Australian Metropolitan Fire Service (SAMFS). However, most towns (over 430 communities) rely on the CFS for day-to-day protection. Several Adelaide suburbs that retain extensive scrubland have CFS stations whose area of operation overlaps that of the SAMFS with joint training exercises sometimes organised for major community facilities such as the Flinders Medical Centre. For urban incidents, both services will often attend with the Metropolitan Fire Service taking command.

== Appearance ==
Two types of personal protective equipment are currently in use: yellow Nomex (left) for rural firefighting, and "PBI Gold" for structure fires.

Reflective tabbard worn at an incident.

The Country Fire Service fire appliances are painted white, rather than red as in many other fire services worldwide. This provides greater visibility on road, and in thick smoke. The day/night striping down the sides of appliances is either the old silver and red standard, or a newer red and gold chequering. Appliances made after 2012 have the newest red and bright yellow chequering. The red and bright yellow chequering provides much better visibility, particularly for crews working on roads. Some appliances are also trialling battenburg striping with bright chevrons on the rear of the appliances.

Fire fighters wear yellow protective clothing, with a two-piece set being the standard (Bunker pants, and turn out coat). With the introduction of PBI Gold (improved structural fire-fighting clothing), all structural PPC is brown coloured clothing. All turn out coats have "CFS" or "FIRE" on the back in reflective writing. More modern jackets also have day/night striping around the sleeves and bottom of the jacket. Safety Vests are provided for work on the roads. these have "Fire", "Rescue", or "CFS" on both front and back in reflective writing.

Firefighters' helmets are white, (senior firefighters have a red stripe), with the firefighters surname on the back of the helmet in red writing on a glow-in-the-dark background. Lieutenants and Captains have yellow helmets (the captain has a red stripe), and Deputy Group Officers and above have red helmets. Regional staff have a blue stripe on their helmet.

== History ==
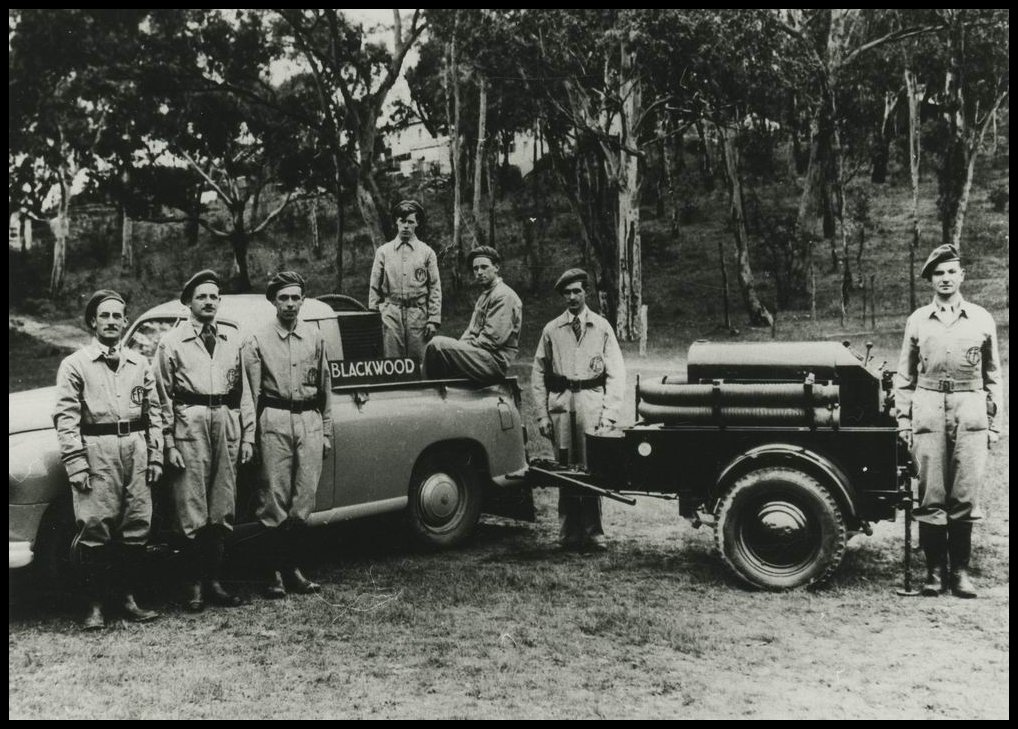
Blackwood Emergency Fire Service in 1949

In colonial times, the government attempted to control the outbreak of wildfires by legislating against the careless use of fire. This began with the 1847 ordinance against reckless burn-offs of stubble and grass. The challenge of fire suppression was left to local residents who would band together to fight fires without any formal organisation or authority. In 1913, district councils were given the right to appoint fire control officers given the power to do anything 'necessary or expedient and practicable' to prevent fires or to protect life and property.

As firefighting technology advanced during World War II, a government-equipped volunteer Emergency Fire Service (EFS) brigade was established in Adelaide followed by additional brigades in some country areas. After the war, equipment from these brigades was lent to district councils for rural firefighting work. To supervise the program, an Emergency Fire Services division was formed as a division of the police department.

Throughout the mid-1950s, the EFS grew stronger and more organised, and volunteers began to campaign for the establishment of the EFS as a statutory authority. This was achieved in 1976 with the passing of the Country Fires Act through the South Australian Government which retitled the EFS as the Country Fire Service (CFS). The Country Fires Act, 1989 pulled the control of the CFS away from district councils to the State Government, allowing for the development of a standardised service able to respond quickly to emergencies across South Australia. In the late 1990s, as part of a drive to ensure that the CFS was properly equipped, another major change in funding was brought in, and the administration of the Service was combined with the administration of several other emergency services. Today, the Emergency Services Levy Funding provides for the training, equipment and administration resources required to maintain the operation of the Service, but the CFS still stands fundamentally on the commitment and energy of its volunteers.

In 2005 the South Australian Fire and Emergency Services (SAFECOM) Act was passed in South Australian Parliament. This act brings the Country Fire Service (SACFS) Metropolitan Fire Service (SAMFS) and South Australian State Emergency Service (SASES) together under one administration board, and funding source. Vince Monterola, CEO of the Country Fire Service at the time, was appointed as the inaugural chairman. It is this Act that defines the Country Fire Service (CFS) as the South Australian Country Fire Service (SACFS). The SAFECOM Act of 2005 replaces the Country Fires Act of 1989, the South Australian Metropolitan Fire Service Act of 1936 and the State Emergency Service Act of 1987.

== Divisions ==
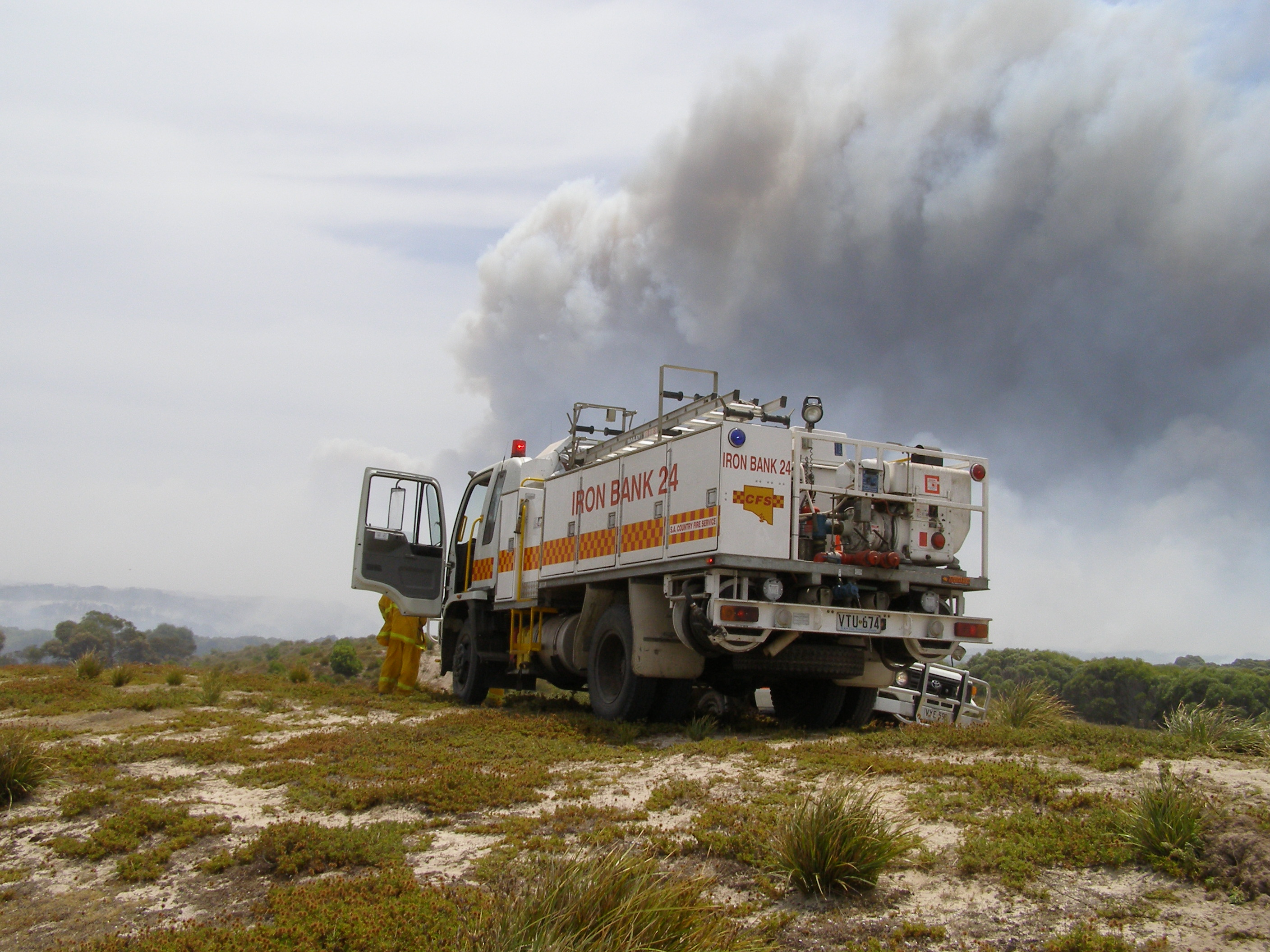
An appliance from Ironbank at a bushfire on Kangaroo Island in 2006.

The CFS is made up of brigades which are organised into groups, which are again grouped into Regions. There are six regions in SA, and 51 groups. The CFS consists of around 425 brigades and about 13,000 volunteers (including operational support members and cadets).

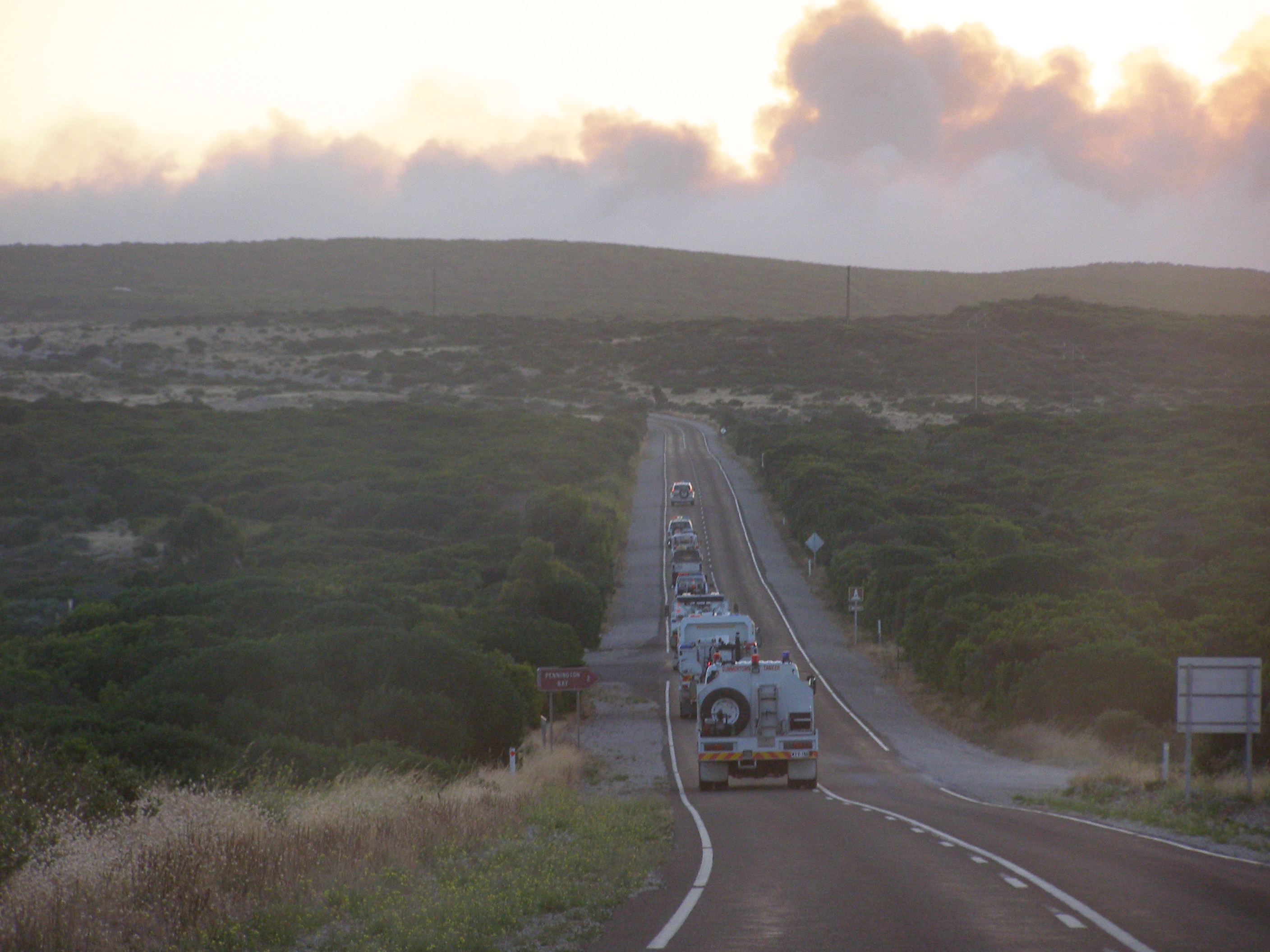
Large regional strike team on Kangaroo Island, January 2006

A "strike team" is a deployment of appliances out of their usual area of operation. A strike team is made up as an operational unit to simplify incident command and control. A strike team typically consists of 5 fire appliances and a leading command car. The most common configuration is 4 Fire fighting appliances and 1 Bulk water carrier. A Strike teams firefighting force will be standardised to an appliance type, such as Rural or Urban Strike team; where Rural Strike teams contain only 24 and 34 type tankers, and an Urban Strike team contains only light/medium/heavy pumper type appliances, with the exception of a Bulk water carrier type appliance. Typically Strike teams are sourced from a group, and are named after their group. (e.g., A strike team from Swanport Group would be called "Swanport strike team"). Strike teams however can be composite made up from appliances from a number of groups. Strike teams are often deployed to regional areas for several days deployment. Often a strike team will be in charge of a particular sector of a fire.

There are also "cascading strike teams", which follow the 1 leader, 5 appliance ratio, however, these types of strike team do not organise prior to the deployment. They are paged in a way that is similar to a normal call out, and then meet up on the fire ground. This is a much quicker way to get trucks to an incident, but, the crews that are deployed in this way are often only used for a single day, as they are less organised and have less preparation time.

Along a similar line task forces are groups of appliances that are mobilised to combat a particular incident out of their usual area of operation. However, task forces are more flexible in their makeup and appliances are usually specifically selected for a particular incident. Where practical the 1 leader with 5 subordinates ratio is maintained for command ability. Unlike Strike teams, Task forces do not require appliance standardisation, hence a "Light Task force" may consist of type 14, Quick Response, and Bulk Water carrier appliances. Task forces attend a wide range of incidents including flooding.

There are also regional strike teams. These strike teams are put together when there are high fire danger days coming up and the CFS does not want to stretch a group's resources. These regional strike teams usually have one or two trucks from a few groups in that region. They sometimes have two or more commanding cars, plus a State Emergency Service vehicle for logistics.

== Chain of Command ==
The CFS chain of command is set out in the following way, with the top being the most senior in rank:

- Chief Officer (Black helmet with a white stripe)
- Deputy Chief Officer (Red helmet with a white stripe)
- Assistant Chief Officer (Red helmet with a white stripe)
- Commander / Regional Commander (Red helmet with a blue stripe)
- Staff/Regional Officer (Red helmet with a blue stripe)
- Group Officer (Red helmet)
- Deputy Group Officer (Red helmet)
- Brigade Captain (Yellow helmet with a red stripe) is the most senior rank in a brigade. The brigade captain is responsible for the operational and administrative aspects of the brigade. The position is elected by members of the brigade. Some of the things that a Captain will do are: undertaking responsibility for the proper management and maintenance of brigade property and equipment, ensuring members of the brigade are properly trained, take command of incidents and ensure that the chain of command within the brigade operates effectively, assisting with bushfire prevention and planning within the brigade's response area, liaising with other captains in adjacent brigades and managing the operations of the brigade in accordance with any determination of the CFS board.
- Brigade Lieutenant. (Yellow helmet) There must be at least two Lieutenants in a brigade and a maximum of four. They are elected to assist the captain in the performance of his or her functions, and take over in the absence of the Captain.
- Senior Firefighter. (White helmet with a red stripe) Senior firefighters assist the Captain and Lieutenants with mainly operational management. They should be experienced personnel within the brigade, and they provide an opportunity for brigades to establish a line of middle management or succession planning. Some people see the position of a Senior as a buildup to becoming a Lieutenant.
- Firefighter (White helmet) is the lowest rank of operational fire personnel, but they are the most important, because they make up the numbers. These firefighters can be trained just as much as a more highly ranked person but they do not usually take a leadership role at an incident.
- Operational Support member. (no helmet) They do not go out on the fire truck. They help out with any of the other jobs that need doing, including fundraising, preparing food, operating the station radio etc.
- Cadet. They do not go out on the fire truck to incidents. The age in which you can become a cadet is 11, but some brigades will set higher minimum ages for their members. Cadets are taught skills which will help them when they become firefighters.

All positions from Group Officer down (inclusive) are voluntary and are elected democratically by firefighters (with the exception of cadets).

Regional Officers and above are appointed by the state government.

Other positions that may be held within a brigade/group are:

- Brigade/Group Communications Coordinator is responsible for ensuring all communication equipment is operational and utilised correctly and efficiently.
- Brigade/Group Training Coordinator coordinates training, including weekly training and ensuring volunteers are placed on appropriate specialist courses.
- Brigade/Group Logistics Support Coordinator provides logistics support at a local level, e.g. food packs on appliances, and resource directories in the radio room.
- Brigade/Group OH&S Coordinator ensures OH&S requirements are met, and near miss and accident report forms are lodged appropriately.
- Brigade/Group Administration Coordinator does administration, including signing up of new members.
- Brigade/Group Finance Coordinator coordinate finances, reimbursements, purchases, and GST claims (often combined with Brigade Administration Coordinator)

=== Leadership ===
Former Chiefs of the Country Fire Service have included:

==== Chief Officer ====
- Brett Loughlin as of September 2022
- Mark Jones QFSM from September 2019 to September 2022
- Greg Nettleton AFSM from 24 January 2011 until 5 July 2019.
- Euan Ferguson AFSM since 2001. Announced resignation on 30th September 2010 to take the role of Chief Fire Officer of the CFA

==== CEO ====
- Vince Monterola AM AFSM (2001–2003)
- Stuart Ellis AM (Military) (1996–2001)
- Alan Ferris (1994–1996)

==== Director ====
- Donald Macarthur (1985–1994)
- Lloyd Johns (1979–1985)
- Fred Kerr (1977–1979, and EFS Director from 1949)

== CFS logos ==
The CFS star logo, now mostly replaced by the 'corporate logo'.

=== Star logo ===
The eight-pointed star logo is used as the official badge of the SA Country Fire Service. It is claimed to have originated from the Maltese Cross, the emblem of the Knights of Malta, which was used by the Knights of Saint John of Jerusalem at the time of the Crusades. The points or tenets were said to represent the knightly virtues of tact, loyalty, dexterity, observation, sympathy, explicitness, gallantry and perseverance. Since these virtues represent the qualities required by a firefighter, the star was chosen for the insignia of the CFS.

Each point of the Star represents a virtue, valued in a fire fighter. These are (from top point, going clockwise): tact, loyalty, dexterity, observation, sympathy, gallantry, explicitness, and perseverance.

Although the corporate 'taxi' logo is now used in most applications, the star is still the official insignia of the CFS.

=== The corporate logo ===
The new corporate logo was introduced in 1999, in an effort to present the modern image of the CFS as a professional organisation. The logo should be used on fire appliances, fleet vehicles, helmets and official CFS publications. The logo was chosen as a result of a competition and is based on a design by a CFS volunteer, Gary MacRae. The red checker pattern representing the fire service, the yellow representing the colour of the CFS turn-out gear, and the map of south Australia representing the area served.

== Dispatch ==
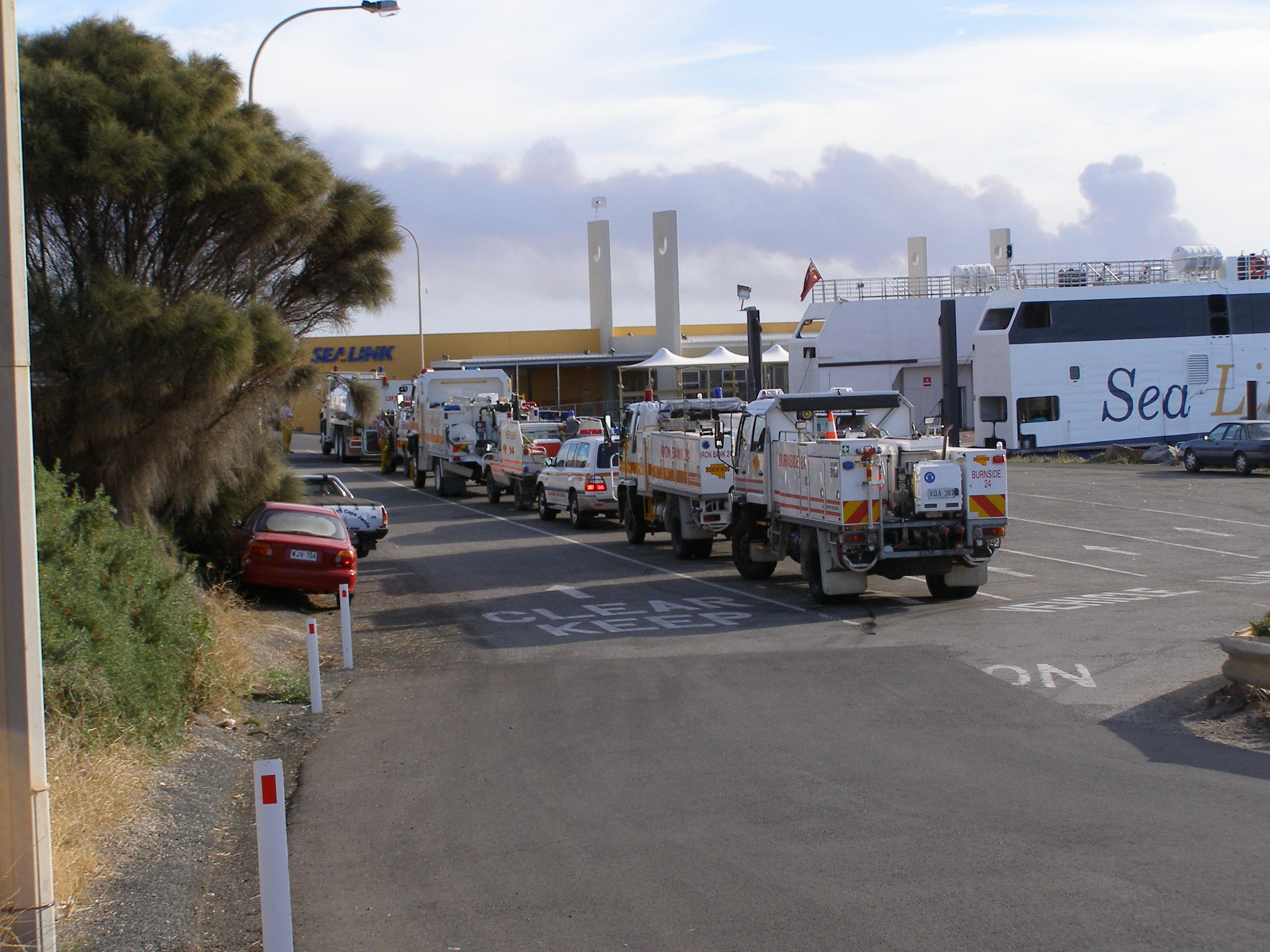
Bush Fire strike team on Kangaroo Island in 2006.

The CFS has a few ways of dispatching brigades to emergencies, however in almost all, pagers are used to alert volunteers to the incident. People wanting to report an incident should ring the national emergency number 000 and ask for 'fire'. Their call will be taken by trained operators at the SAMFS communications centre. Brigades can also be responded by notifying a brigade in person, or by ringing the local brigade's phone (if the station is staffed).

As of July 2007, all dispatch and day-to-day state operations were relocated to the SAMFS communications centre. SAMFS are now the lead agency undertaking dispatch for MFS, CFS and SES.

South Australia's dispatch callsign is 'Adelaide Fire', SAMFS, SACFS and SASES all use this call sign to contact dispatch.

== Responsibility ==
In addition to supporting the SES regarding flood damage, and weather damage (e.g. trees over roads), the CFS responds to three main incident types.

=== Motor vehicle accident (MVA) spillages, and Road Crash Rescue (RCR) ===
The CFS provides fire cover and cleanup at road accidents. When there are entrapments, the CFS will provide fire cover, and when required will respond with rescue appliances with the appropriate tools for stabilising and extricating trapped casualties. They also perform other rescue duties, such as rope (vertical / high angle) rescue, they do not attend specialist rescues as a general rule of thumb however. Confined space, swiftwater rescue, flood rescue, vertical rescue, high angle rescue, USAR, SAR and vehicle impacts are traditionally the responsibility of the State Emergency Service, South Australian Ambulance Service, South Australia Police and the Metropolitan Fire Service.

The Country Fire Service often performs these duties assisting other agencies. Such as the Metropolitan Fire Service (SAMFS), State Emergency Service (SES), South Australian Police (SAPOL), the South Australian Ambulance Service (SAAS) and Water Operations (Volunteer Coast Guard, SES, F MAS, life saving or Sea Rescue).

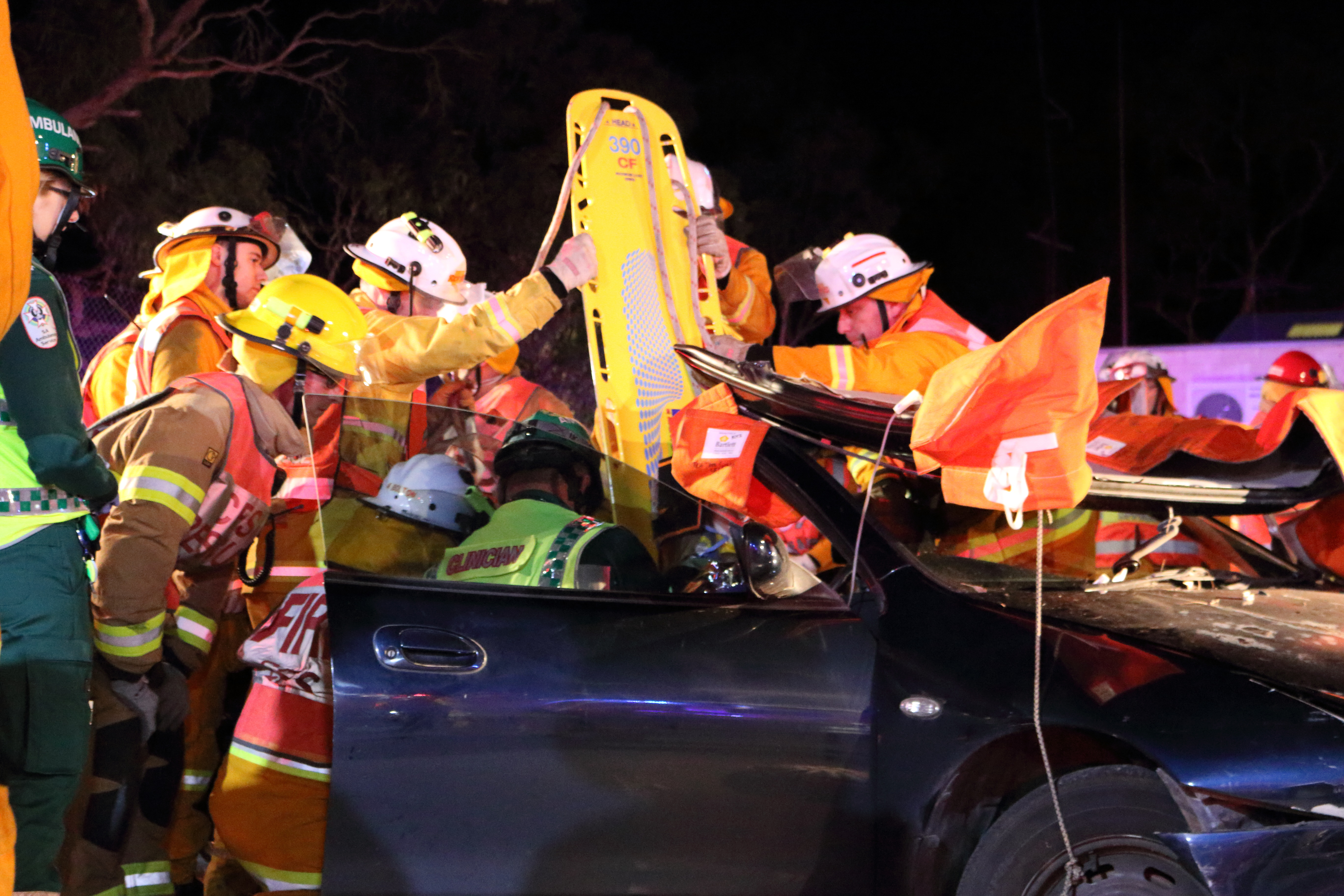
Crews extricate a patient from a simulated motor vehicle accident as part of a training exercise.

=== Fire fighting ===
Fire fighting is the main job of the CFS. They respond to any fires including country and urban. Fire fighters combat grass fires, bush fires, crop fires, scrub fires, haystack fires, and brush fence fires, house fires, chimney fires, car fires, rubbish bin fires etc. Many trucks carry breathing apparatus (there are around 800 sets of breathing apparatus spread across the state with most groups having at least 2 brigades (each having 1 vehicle with a minimum of 2 sets) equipped. Vehicles are equipped with foam induction systems to allow the use of foam as a fire fighting agent should the operation require it.

The CFS's specialty is the containment, control and extinguishing of bushfires.

=== Special service ===
The CFS is the combatant authority for HAZMAT (hazardous materials) incidents. However, not all brigades respond to these. As HAZMAT incidents require a lot of people, only about 1 in 10 brigades are HAZMAT trained, and resources are drawn from all over the state. Urban fringe brigades also do "Enhanced Mutual Aid" with the SA Metropolitan Fire Service. This involves change of quarters to metropolitan stations and responding to incidents in the metropolitan area.

== Appliances ==
The CFS has 5 types of appliances: urban appliances, rural appliances, specialised appliances, Combinations of all three.

=== Rural appliances ===
CFS Appliances have a call sign which describes the appliance. The most common rural appliances are the 24 (Pronounced two-four), which means it carries 2000 litres of water and is a 4-wheel drive (4WD) and the 34 (Pronounced three-four), which means it carries 3000 litres of water and is a 4-wheel drive (4WD). Other common appliances are 14 (1000L, 4WD), pumpers and QRV (330-500L 4WD). The newest appliance is the 44 (Pronounced "four-four"), which means it carries 4,000 litres of water and is 4 wheel drive (4wd).

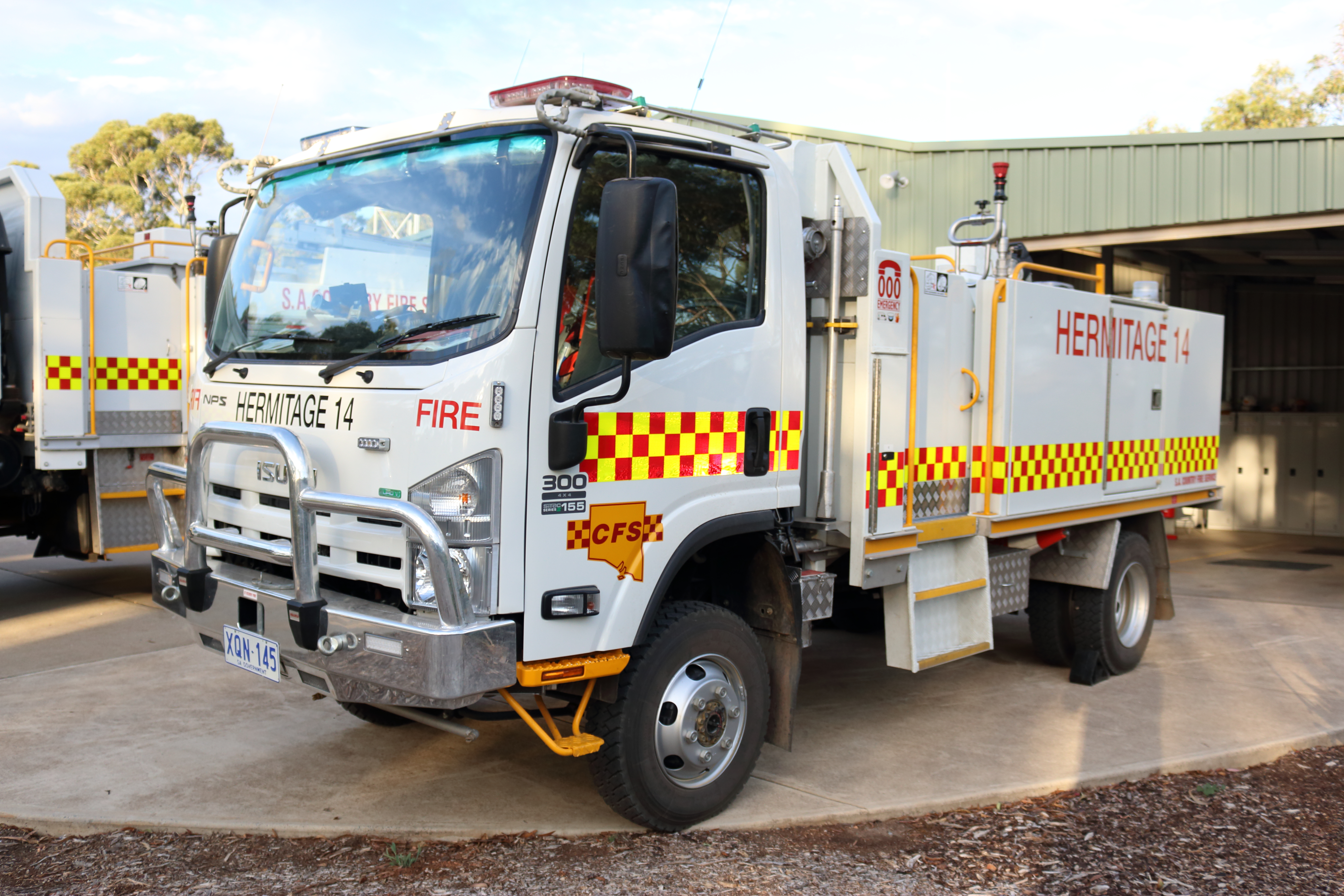
New CFS 14 type appliance (Hermitage 2013) – carries 1600 litres of water, four-wheel drive capable, and is deployed in both urban and rural environments.

These figures are the nominal water carrying capacity. Fire fighting appliances carry water, foam and other fire fighting related tools and equipment. They are designed for bush/scrub/grass fire fighting however can be utilised for a number of other duties. Bulk Water Carriers (BWC, previously called 'Tankers'), which carry large volumes of water (up to 30,000 litres), also respond to rural related incidents, however may be used as water sources for structural fires, car fires, HAZMAT incidents etc., where water sources are minimal.

These rural appliances are extremely important for keeping South Australia protected from fires. Almost every town in South Australia would have at least two of these rural fire trucks. The reason that there are many different types of rural trucks, is because the terrain changes a lot in South Australia. A 14 appliance, typically only carries 1000 litres nominally, but new single cab variations hold the capacity for up to 1600 litres. 14 appliances are extremely useful for getting into small tracks which larger appliances can not. Large 34s often have trouble in getting into smaller areas. 24s are the most common, because they are not too heavy and big, but carry a reasonable amount of water, which can last a good time before having to fill up. In most parts of South Australia outside major centres there is no water mains, so this is where Bulk Water Carriers come in handy. These BWCs, often at a rural fire, will be stationary at the edge of it, for smaller trucks to fill up from. when empty it is their job to go and find water in places including, rivers, dams, swimming pools and water tanks.

=== Urban appliances ===
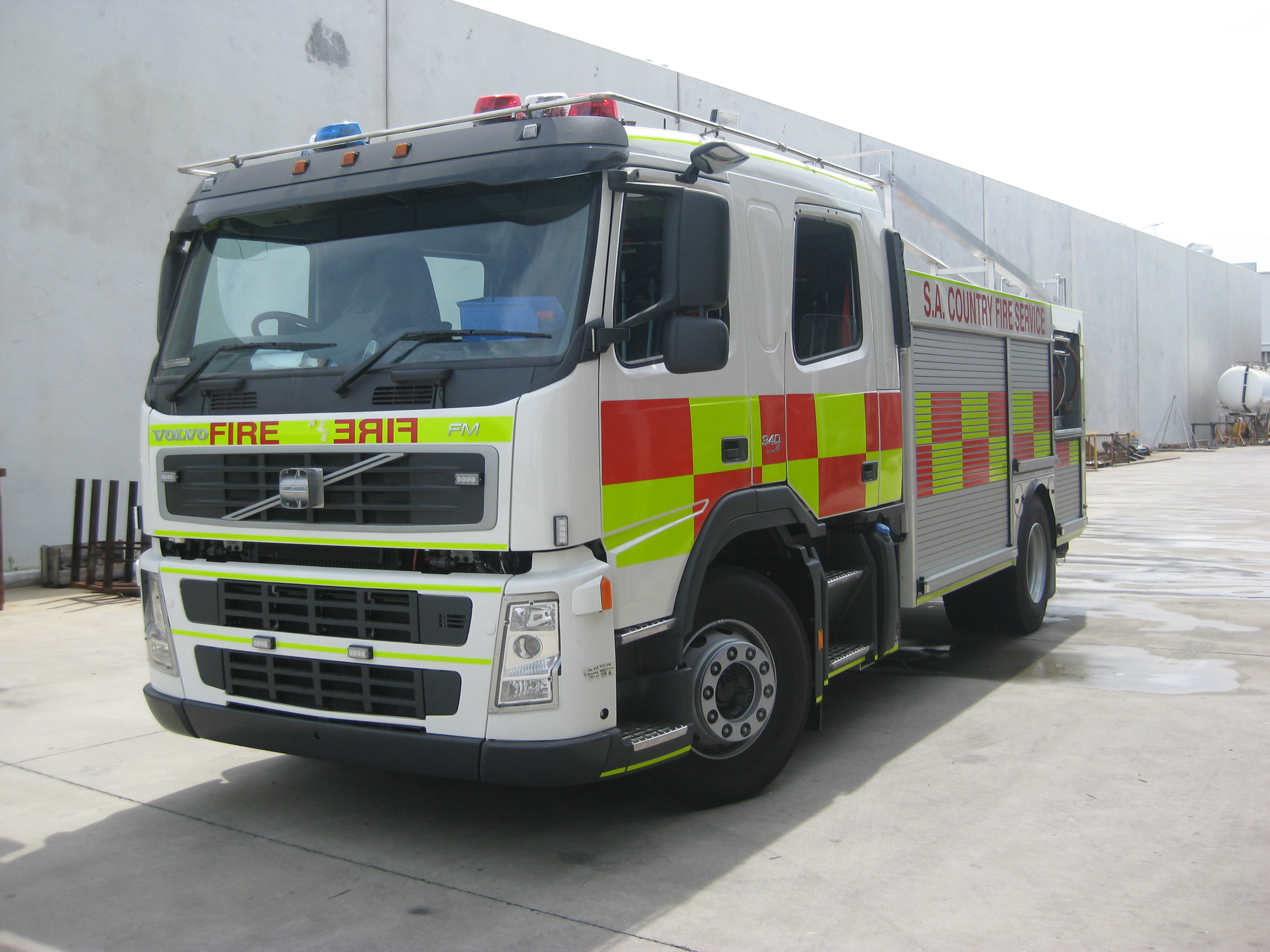
New CFS Pumper (Burnside 2009) – Carries 4 x BA (3 x in-seat), rescue and Hazmat equipment and is deployed in urban and rural environments.

Urban appliances are usually Pumpers', 24Pumpers' (24P) or 34Pumpers' (34P). They have bigger pumps and more specialised equipment (e.g. extra SCBA sets), and are more suitable for responding to urban incidents like house fires, car accidents etc. Since 2019, the CFS has introduced an Urban-Rural Pumper (URP), typically a 24 or 34 with a larger pump, which adds the benefit of being a rural appliance whilst also being able to serve a township as a pumper appliance. (Similar to a 24Pumper/34Pumper).

=== Specialised appliances ===
These are trucks which are designed for one purpose, like Rescue, or HAZMAT. Usually these are combined with another truck. (e.g. A pumper will be a combined Pumper/HAZMAT truck, or Pumper/Rescue) There are seven statewide HAZMAT trucks, at least one for each Region, which are based at Burnside CFS, Lincoln, Murray Bridge, Naracoorte, Nuriootpa, Stirling North, and Dalkeith that responds to any HAZMAT incidents in the state. They carry extra air cylinders for the Breathing Apparatus as well as gas tight suits, liquid tight suits, splash suits, atmospheric monitoring equipment, and other specialised equipment.

=== Vehicle inventory ===
According to the Basic Firefighting 1 (BF1) manual, the CFS vehicles are such:

- 73 Urban appliances
- 515 Rural Appliances
- 7 Multi purpose appliances
- 7 state HAZMAT response appliances
- 71 Command vehicles
- 11 Rescue Vehicles
- 19 Tankers
- 150 Miscellaneous transport vehicles

== Training ==
=== Skills Training ===
The CFS pays for all its volunteers to be trained to the required level. It has a world class training centre at Brukunga, in the Adelaide Hills, where the specialised courses are held. However, some courses are trained by other services or companies, like first aid, given by St John Ambulance SA. There is another training centre, called the south coast training centre, but it is not as well equipped, nor funded. Here is a list of some of the courses available.

- Basic Firefighting 1 (BF1) (Basic training course) (Nationally accredited)
- Suppress Wildfire (Level 2) (Nationally accredited)
- Defensive Fire Suppression (Level 3) (Nationally accredited)
- Plantation Fire Fighting
- Operate Breathing Apparatus Open Circuit (Nationally accredited)
- Compartment Fire Behaviour (Nationally accredited)
- Hazmat (Nationally accredited)
- Road crash rescue (Nationally accredited)
- Applied First Aid
- Advanced Resuscitation
- Rope Rescue (Nationally accredited)
- AIIMS incident management (Nationally accredited)
- Leadership
- Navigate in Urban and Rural Environments
- Global Positioning Systems Instructor
- Leadership (Nationally accredited)
- SPAM (Stress Prevention And Management)
- Train Small Groups
- Flammable Liquids (FL)/Liquid Petroleum Gas (LPG) Workshop
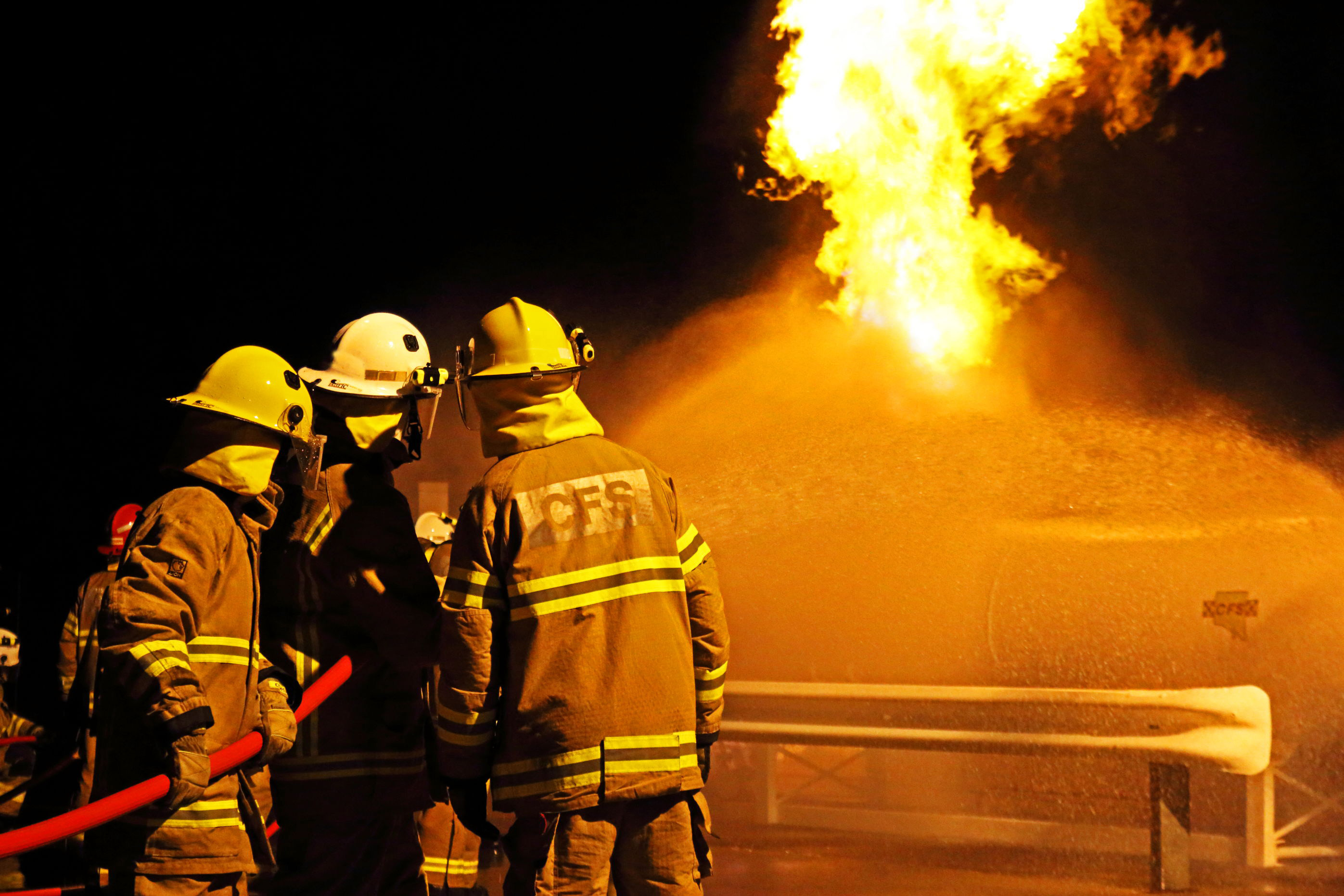
  Fire fighters train to combat LP gas fires.
- Atmosphere Monitoring

=== Weekly Training ===
Fire fighters test a hose line during training.

Most urban stations have a weekly training, the time of this training differs between brigades. (Some brigades opt to have 2 training days a week, so that all members can attend). In this training time CFS members will revise skills which they have learnt in skill training. This training time is also used for organisation and maintenance. Below is a list of common things that happen on Training nights.

- Testing of equipment
- Pumps, pumping and draughting
- Social Games with other brigades
- Map reading, and navigation
- Communication skills
- Mock Search and Rescue
- Vehicle and station maintenance
- Fitness tests
- Mock Vehicle accidents
- Mock running grass fire
- Other mock incidents

== Deaths in the line of duty ==
As of 2025, 17 deaths have occurred in the line of duty.

Date	Brigade	Rank	Name	Age	Incident/Cause of death
15 February 1979	Athelstone Brigade	Senior Firefighter	Barry James McLoughlin	33	Vehicle accident en route to fire, Gorge Rd, Athelstone.
16 February 1983	Callendale Brigade		Brian Nosworthy	52	Ash Wednesday Fire
16 February 1983	Summertown Brigade	Brigade Firefighter	Peter Ralph Matthies	27	Caught in fire. Ash Wednesday Fire
16 February 1983	Lucindale Brigade	Brigade Firefighter	Andrew Eric Lemke	23	Ash Wednesday Fire
18 March 1985	Yeelanna Brigade	Brigade Firefighter	Dean Russell Dennis	49	Property fire, Possible heart failure at incident
22 January 1986	Lobethal Brigade	Captain	Brian Arthur Fox		Heart attack at incident
23 March 1990	Burnside Brigade	Brigade Firefighter	Peter Donald Stacy	25	Vehicle accident at incident
1 May 1990	Waterloo Brigade	Brigade Firefighter	Howard Herbert Kruse	51	Heart failure
1 February 1991	Yahl Brigade	Brigade Firefighter	Robert Leslie Jones	42	Heart attack at structure fire, Johnston's Road, O.B. Flat
21 August 1993	Moorook Brigade	Brigade Firefighter	Peter Geoffrey Aird	46	Heart attack at incident
10 March 1994	Strathalbyn Group, Strathalbyn Brigade	Deputy Group Officer	Leslie John Peek	48	Heart attack at incident
11 January 2005	Cummins Brigade	Brigade Firefighter	Trent Alan Murnane	30	Wangary Fires
11 January 2005	Ungarra Brigade	Brigade Firefighter	Neil George Richardson	54	Wangary Fires
31 October 2014	Mount Templeton Brigade	Brigade Lieutenant	Andrew Raymond Harrison	38	Nantawarra Fire
9 December 2014	Wattle Range Group, Millicent Brigade	Deputy Group Officer	Brian Johnston	65	Rendlesham Fire
21 January 2022	Happy Valley Brigade	Senior Firefighter	Louise Hincks	44	Falling tree, Coles Fire
23 November 2025	National Parks and Wildlife Service Brigade	Firefighter	Peter Curtis	65	Under investigation, Pinkawillinie fire

== See also ==
- 1983 Ash Wednesday bushfires
- 2005 Eyre Peninsula bushfire
- 2015 Sampson Flat bushfires
- 2015 Pinery Bushfire
- Emergency Fire Service (The CFS before 1979)
- Metropolitan Fire Service (SAMFS, South Australia)
- National Council for Fire & Emergency Services
- State Emergency Service
