= Emergency Fire Service =

South Australian rural emergency service

Coordinates: 28°33′17.09″S 134°59′16.02″E

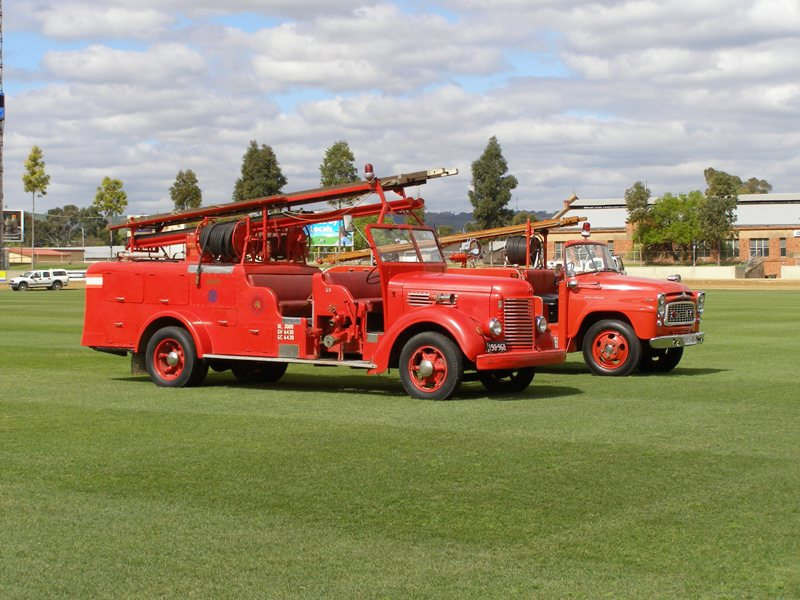
EFS trucks

The Emergency Fire Service (EFS) was the fire and emergency service that operated in rural areas of South Australia in the 20th century. In 1979, with the passing of the Country Fires Act in the South Australian Parliament, the EFS was renamed the SA Country Fire Service.

== History ==
The EFS (or now CFS) springs from a long and complex partnership between volunteers, local government and the South Australian government to meet community safety needs. The partnership began as an attempt to deal with fires in rural areas.

Also, in colonial times, government only attempted to control the outbreak of wildfire by legislating against the careless use of fire, beginning with the 1847 ordinance against reckless burn-offs or stubble and grass. Fire suppression was left to local residents who would band together to fight fires as they arose without any formal organisation or authority to set backburns. In 1913, Councils were given the right to appoint Fire Control Officers, with powers to do anything 'necessary or expedient and practicable' to prevent fires, or to protect life and property in the case of fire, or to control or extinguish a fire including backburning.

Technological expansion after the Second World War revolutionised rural firefighting with the development of radios, telephones, motor transport and the knapsack spray. Rural residents also began to form into local or district firefighting associations.

Later as part of the Second World War-effort, government-equipped volunteer Emergency Fire Service (EFS) brigades were established, at first in Adelaide, and later in some country areas. After the war, equipment from these groups was lent to District Councils for rural firefighting work. To supervise the program, an Emergency Fire Services operation was formed within the Police Department. Gradually the many local council brigades began to feel part of a statewide service.

From the mid-1950s, the EFS organisation grew stronger, and volunteers began to campaign for the EFS to be established as a statutory authority. This was achieved in 1976, with the passing of the Country Fires Act, which set up the SA Country Fire Service (CFS).

== See also ==
- SA Country Fire Service
- SA Metropolitan Fire Service
