= National Council for Fire & Emergency Services =

Body representing fire and emergency service authorities in Australasia

The National Council for Fire & Emergency Services, formerly the Australasian Fire & Emergency Service Authorities Council (AFAC), is the peak body responsible for representing fire, emergency services and land management agencies in the Australasian region. It was formed in 1993 and has 34 full members and 13 affiliate members.

== Members ==
Members are drawn from every state and territory in Australia and New Zealand and from around the Pacific Ocean. Full members for the council and affiliate members still have access to the support and knowledge network of AFAC without holding a seat on the AFAC council. The current member list is as follows:

=== Full members ===
==== Australia ====
- Airservices Australia

===== Australian Capital Territory =====
- Australian Capital Territory Emergency Services Agency
- ACT Parks and Conservation Service

===== New South Wales =====
- Department of Climate Change, Energy, the Environment & Water
- Fire & Rescue New South Wales
- Forests NSW
- New South Wales Rural Fire Service
- New South Wales State Emergency Service

===== Northern Territory =====
- Bushfires NT
- Northern Territory Emergency Service
- Northern Territory Fire & Rescue Service

===== Queensland =====
- Department of the Environment, Tourism, Science & Innovation
- Queensland Fire Department

===== South Australia =====
- Department for Environment & Water
- ForestrySA
- South Australian Country Fire Service
- South Australian Metropolitan Fire Service
- South Australian State Emergency Service

===== Tasmania =====
- Sustainable Timber Tasmania
- Tasmania Parks & Wildlife Service
- State Emergency Service Tasmania
- Tasmania Fire Service

===== Victoria =====
- Country Fire Authority
- Department of Energy, Environment & Climate Action
- Fire Rescue Victoria
- Parks Victoria
- Victoria State Emergency Service

===== Western Australia =====
- Department of Biodiversity, Conservation and Attractions
- DFES State Emergency Service
- Department of Fire & Emergency Services

==== New Zealand ====
- Fire and Emergency New Zealand

=== Affiliate members ===
- Attorney-General's Department (Australia)
- Australasian Road Rescue Organisation (ARRO)
- Bureau of Meteorology
- CSIRO Forestry & Forest Products
- Department of Conservation (New Zealand)
- EMQUAL
- Forestry Plantations Queensland
- Hong Kong Fire Services Department
- Melbourne Water
- Office of the Fire Services Commissioner Victoria
- Pacific Islands Fire Service Association (PIFSA)
- Papua New Guinea Fire Service
- South Australian Fire and Emergency Services Commission

== AFAC Knowledge Web ==
'The AFAC Knowledge Web was an initiative born out of the Cooperative Research Centre (CRC)'s Fire Knowledge Network project. That project aimed to bring together the broad spectrum of research, both within the CRC and from researchers in other organisations, together with local knowledge, and lessons from history.

A joint partnership between the CRC and AFAC, this concept was expanded to draw in the operational knowledge of fire, land management and emergency service organisations in Australia and New Zealand, creating an online source of knowledge and sharing for the industry.'

It was launched on 1 September 2008 at the Annual AFAC Bushfire CRC Conference.

Members of the public are able to access a wide range of content such as research reports, case studies and AFAC news articles. Membership of the Knowledge Web is currently only open to volunteers and staff of AFAC member agencies and key research partners.
