= Tasmania Fire Service =

Australian fire and rescue service

Operational area
- Country: Australia
- State: Tasmania

Agency overview
- Established: 1 November 1979
- Employees: 350
- Staffing: 5000 volunteers
- Fire and Emergency Services Commissioner: Jeremy Smith

Facilities and equipment
- Brigades: 230
- Trucks: 450 (2008)
- Platforms: 3
- Wildland: Specialty
- Light and air: Specialty

Website
- www.fire.tas.gov.au

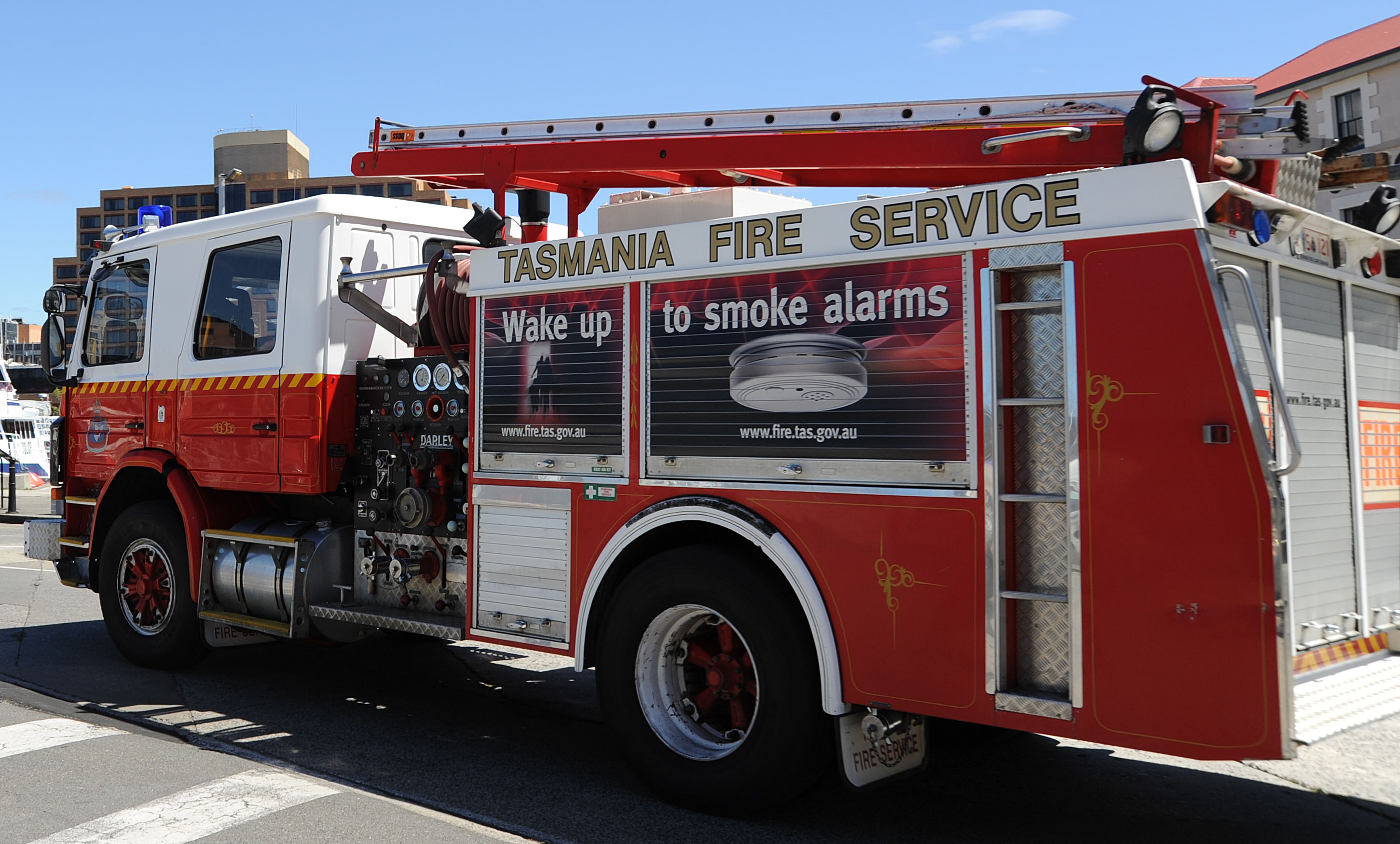
A Tasmania Fire Service truck

The Tasmania Fire Service (TFS) is the Tasmanian Government agency responsible for fire suppression and control in the state of Tasmania and its surrounding islands.

Established on 1 November 1979 as a result of enacting the Fire Service Act 1979, the TFS superseded the State Fire Authority, the Rural Fires Board and 22 urban fire brigades.

== Callsigns ==
The Callsign system for the Tasmania Fire Service (TFS) Is as follows

The first digit shows the category and the second shows how many of that category are in the Station

e.g. Hobart 1.2 Is Hobart's second Heavy pumper

Callsign System
Callsign	Type
0.*	Car
1.*	Heavy Pumper
2.*	Medium Pumper
3.*	Heavy Tanker
4.*	Medium Tanker
5.*	Light Tanker
6.*	Hydraulic Platform
7.*	GTV (General Transportation Vehicle)
8.*	Misc/Special

9. State Emergency Service Vehicles, Can Be RCR, Storm Response or utility 4*4 Vehicles

== See also ==
- Bushfires in Australia
- Firefighting
- National Council for Fire & Emergency Services
