= Northern Territory Fire and Rescue Service =

Australian territory emergency service

Northern Territory Fire & Rescue Service
- Logo of the NTFRS
- Established: 1941
- Headquarters: St Stuart Park, Northern Territory
- Members: 11 Permanent stations; 16 Volunteer stations
- Director: Steve Rothwell
- Ministry: Police, Fire and Emergency Services
- Website: Official website

Northern Territory Fire and Rescue Service, or NTFRS, (in conjunction with Bushfires NT) is the primary provider of fire and rescue services throughout the Northern Territory of Australia. It consists of 27 fire stations, 16 being staffed by volunteer brigade units, 5 being staffed 24 hours a day by career firefighters, and the remainder by a mix of career and auxiliary fire fighters.

The NTFRS is made up approximately 180 permanent staff working in the regional centres of Darwin, Alice Springs, Tennant Creek, Katherine, Nhulunbuy, Yulara and Jabiru, as well as 54 part-time auxiliaries and approximately 250 volunteers.

The NTFRS is part of the NT Government "Tri-Service", Northern Territory Police, Fire and Emergency Services, or NTPFES. The CEO of the NTPFES and Commissioner of Northern Territory Police in 2022 was Jamie Chalker, APM. The NTPFES falls under the portfolio of the Minister for Police, Fire and Emergency Services.

== History ==
Unlike many other Australian brigades the NTFRS is relatively young. The first permanent Chief Fire Officer took command of a newly formed Darwin civil brigade on 31 October 1941, however following the Bombing of Darwin by Japanese forces during World War II, fire fighting duties were assumed by the military after general evacuation of the civilian population. This made The Northern Territory Fire Service the only capital city Australian Fire Service to serve under enemy fire. It was not until 1946 that the Darwin civil brigade was reformed, with another small brigade formed in the large regional centre of Alice Springs in 1949.

The original Darwin fire station and fire service headquarters was located in Darwin city on Daly street, this station was closed and the Iliffe street station was opened in Oct 1988. Serving outer Darwin was the Winnellie Fire station opened in 1970–71, which was closed with the opening of the Palmerston Fire station in the newly formed satellite city of Palmerston in 1984. Serving the rural area of Darwin is the Humpty Doo station that was opened in 2005. To better serve the Northern suburbs of Darwin the old Casuarina station was closed and the new Marrara fire station was opened on 14 June 2007.

The history of the NTFRS was researched and written by former Assistant Commissioner of the NT Police Bill Wilson.

== Organisational structure ==
- Director/Chief Fire Officer – Mark Spain
- Deputy Chief Fire Officer Territory Operations – Stephen Sewell
- Assistant Chief Fire Officer Strategy and Capability – Joshua Fischer
- District Officer Fire Safety Command
- District Officer Training and Development Command – Ian Lockley
- District Officer Darwin Command
- District Officer Southern Command – David Letheby
- District Officer Northern Command – Gerry Seville
- District Officer Special Operations

== Chief Fire Officers ==
- Feb 2025 – Present Stephen Sewell
- Jul 2016 – Feb 2025 Mark Spain
- Sep 2011 – Mar 2016 Steve Rothwell
- Jan 2005 – Jan 2011 Greg Nettleton
- Jan 2004 – Jan 2005 Thomas Konieczny
- Jan 2002 – Jan 2004 Daryl Pepper
- Jul 1992 – Jan 2002 Ian Rae
- Jul 1990 – Jul 1992 Kenneth Copeland
- Oct 1986 – Jul 1990 Geoffrey Skerritt
- Oct 1984 – Oct 1986 Jeffrey Godfredson
- Jul 1983 – Oct 1984 Alan Ferris
- Jul 1981 – Jul 1983 William Henderson
- Aug 1967 – Jul 1981 Peter Holtham
- Jun 1956 – Jul 1967 George Robbins

== Fire Stations ==
=== Full Time Stations ===
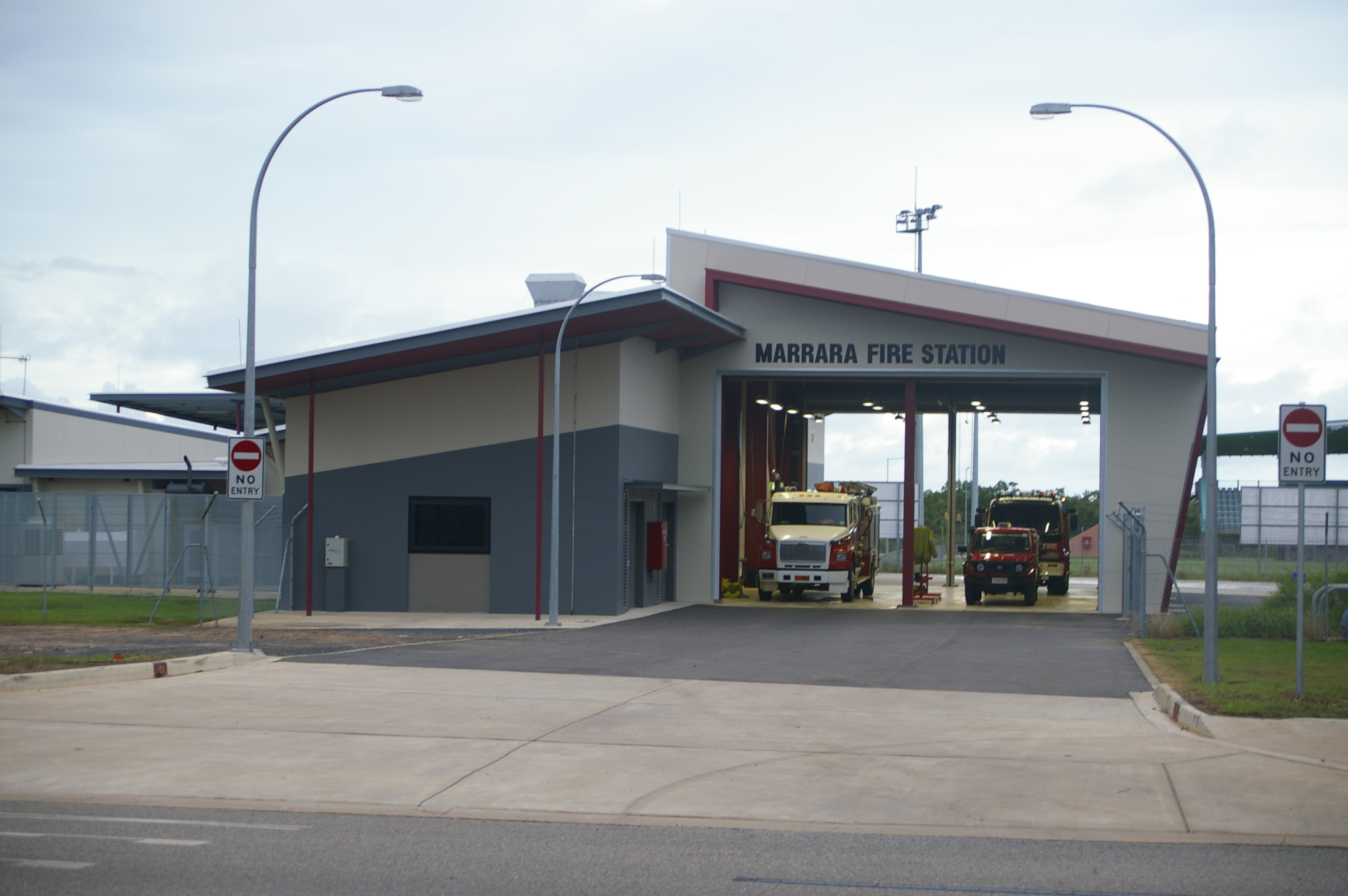
Marrara Fire Station

- Darwin
- Marrara (A suburb of Darwin)
- Palmerston
- Berrimah (A suburb of Darwin)
- Katherine
- Nhulunbuy
- Jabiru
- Tennant Creek
- Alice Springs
- Yulara
- Humpty Doo

=== Volunteer stations ===
Alice Springs Rural (VFB), Bathurst Island (VFB), Virginia Bees Creek (VFB), Howard Springs (VFB), Humpty Doo (VFB), Koolpinyah (VFB), Larrimah (VFB), Yirrkala (VFB), Adelaide River (FERG), Bachelor (FERG), Borroloola (FERG), Elliott (FERG), Mataranka (FERG), Pine Creek (FERG), Timber Creek (FERG)

VFB – Volunteer Fire Brigade

FERG – Fire Emergency Response Group

== Fleet and resources ==
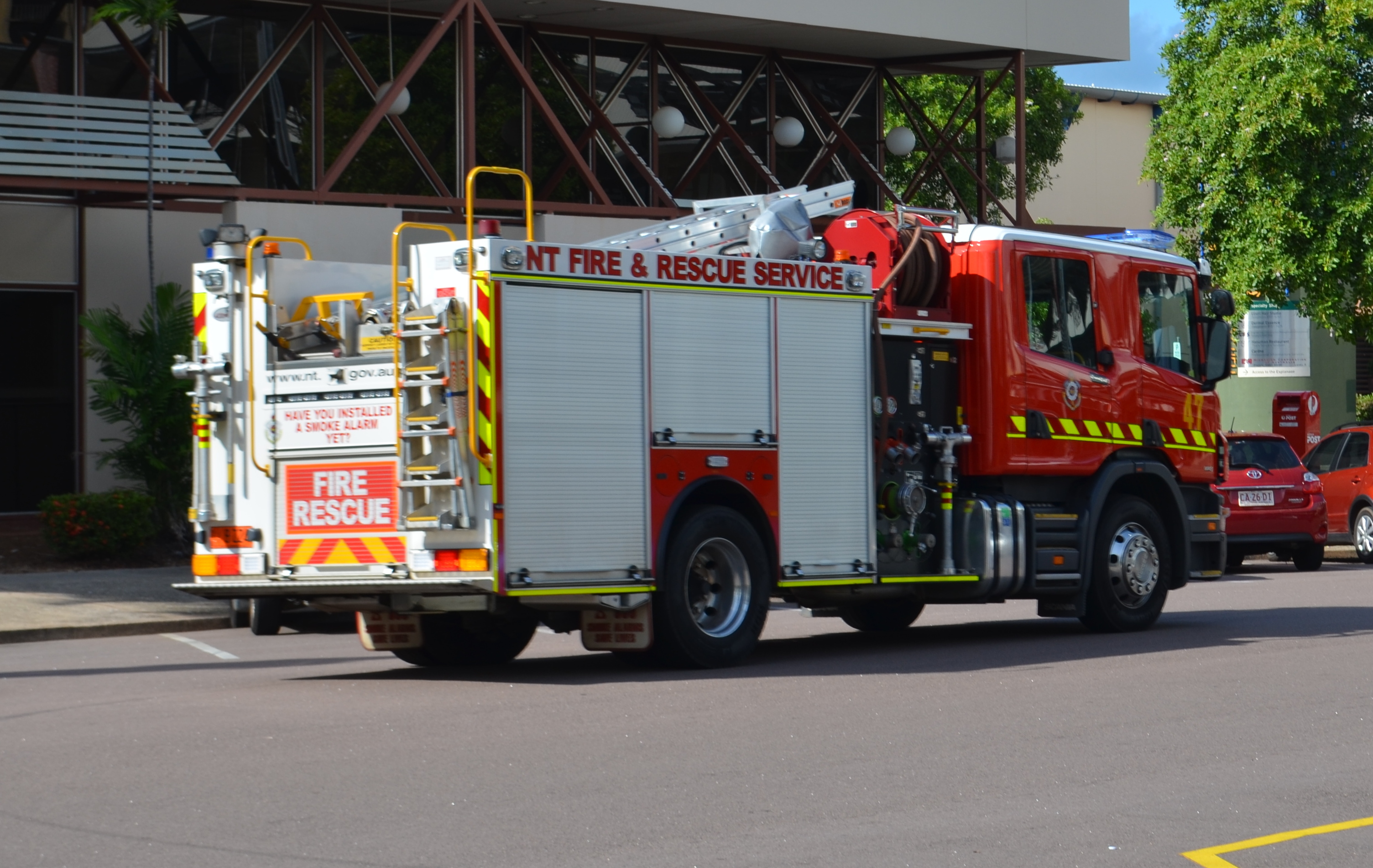
A Scania pumper appliance

NTFRS Vehicles include a new fleet of Scania medium and heavy pumpers, and older medium and heavy Freightliner pumps, an aerial appliance, numerous tankers and grass fire units, plus rescue, command and utility vehicles. The NTFRS also has trailers for Fire Investigation, Rapid Decontamination and a BA trailer for refilling SCBA Cylinders in the field.

Due to the relatively small size of the NTFRS, rather than having dedicated specialised sections, general firefighters are trained in various disciplines, including: HAZMAT, USAR, Road Crash Rescue, Paramedic, School Based Education, and Wildfire.

=== Callsign Structure ===
The NTFRS uses a callsign system for appliances, designed to identify a vehicles class and which brigade it belongs to over the radio. The callsign features the brigades name, followed by a numerical sequence, with the first number in that sequence identifying the vehicles class, and the numbers following identify that vehicles own number within that class. For example, the callsign "Alice Springs 915" tells us the vehicles is an Isuzu Tanker, belonging to the Alice Springs Fire Station, and is the 15th vehicle within the Isuzu Tanker class. All vehicles within the NTFRS are required to have the numerical sequence printed on the roof of the vehicle, allowing for easier identification from waterbombing aircraft deployed at bushfires.

This table shows how the NTFRS has allocated numerical callsigns. The NTFRS doesn't use the number "5" for any callsigns.

Number	Vehicle Class	Example Callsign
1	Command / Utility Vehicle	Darwin 107
2	Light Composite Pumper	Yulara 27
3	Grassfire Unit	Emily Hills 340
4	Foam Pumper	Alice Springs 47
6	Aerial Appliance	Darwin 64
7	Specialist Appliance	Palmerston 72
8	Rescue Tender	Tennant Creek 84
9	Isuzu Tanker	Jabiru 97

== See also ==
- National Council for Fire & Emergency Services
