= Adelaide Fire Station =

Heritage listed fire station in Adelaide, Australia

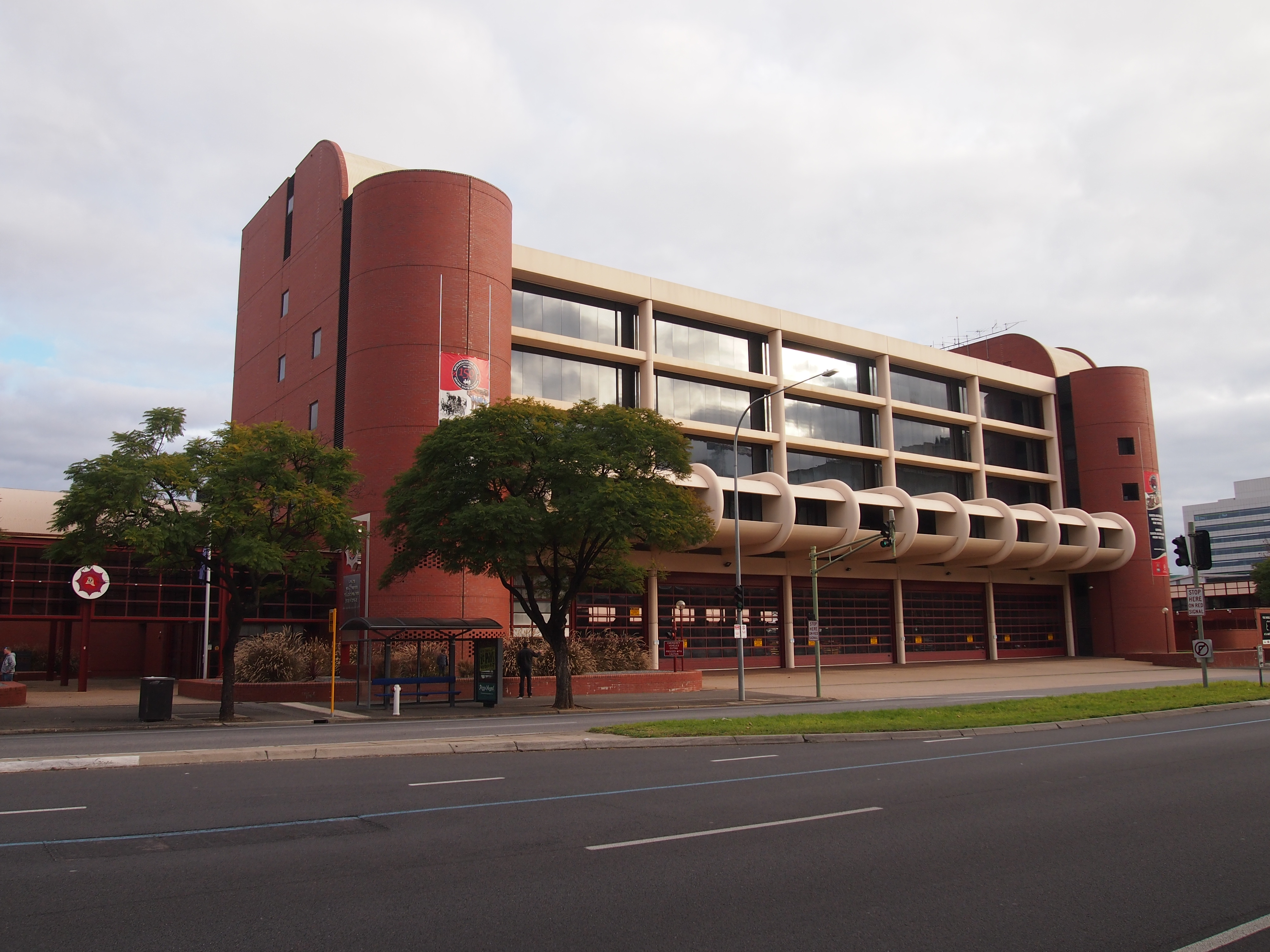

- Location within South Australia
- 34°55′43″S 138°36′17″E
- Location: 99 Wakefield Street, Adelaide, South Australia

History
- Built: 1983

Site notes
- Architect(s): Rod Roach, Woodhead Australia
- Architectural style: Postmodern
- Governing body: South Australian Metropolitan Fire Service
- Owner: Government of South Australia

South Australian Heritage Register
- Designated: 16 September 2015
- Reference no.: 27078

Adelaide Fire Station is a fire station located in Wakefield Street, Adelaide, the state capital of South Australia.

It was designed by architects Rod Roach and Woodhead Australia, it is notable "for its innovative design is an outstanding example of postmodern architecture", it was designed and built during 1976 to 1983.

The complex includes auxiliary buildings and a concrete training tower.

It was listed on the South Australian Heritage Register on 16 September 2015.

== See also ==
- List of fire stations
- Timeline of Adelaide history, which mentions large fires, including one across from a predecessor fire station
