= South Australian State Emergency Service =

South Australian State Emergency Service (SASES)
- Logo of the SASES

Agency overview
- Formed: 1974
- Preceding agency: Civil Defence (1962 – 1974)
- Jurisdiction: South Australia
- Headquarters: 37 Richmond Road, Keswick, South Australia, Australia
- Employees: Approx. 1,800
- Annual budget: Approx. AU$18 million
- Minister responsible: Emily Bourke
- Agency executives: Chris Beattie, Chief Officer (October 2010 - Current); Kristy Phelps, Deputy Chief Officer (March 2025 - Current)
- Parent department: South Australian Fire and Emergency Services Commission (SAFECOM)
- Website: https://www.ses.sa.gov.au/site/home.jsp

The South Australian State Emergency Service (SASES, commonly known as the SES) is the South Australian branch of the State Emergency Service, a partner of the Australian Council of State Emergency Services (ACSES). The agency, founded in 1962, is a volunteer-based civil defence organisation that prepares for and responds to man-made and natural disasters within the state. It receives, on average, 10,000 calls for assistance per year. The SASES is a separate entity, independent of other state SES organisations, and reports to the South Australian Minister for Emergency Services. The service is funded by a levy imposed on every household in South Australia, and is currently led by Chief Officer Chris Beattie with assistance from the South Australian Fire and Emergency Services Commission (SAFECOM).

== History ==
=== Organisational history ===
- 1962 – Founded the Civil Defence Organisation within the state government, headquartered at Thebarton's police barracks, led by Ron Nichols. Uniform initially dark blue, later changed to white.
- 1974 – Name of the organisation changed to South Australia State Emergency Service.
- 1983 – Introduction of the currently used orange overalls volunteer uniform.
- 1984 – Brian Lancaster made chief officer.
- 1990s – Relocation of headquarters to Adelaide CBD.
- 1993 – SASES Volunteers Organisation formed.
- 2000 – The organisation moved to operate within the Emergency Services Administration Unit (ESAU).
- 2004 – Brian Lancaster resigned from chief officer, replaced by acting chief officer Nat Cook.
- 2005 – Organisation became independent, operating under the guidance of SAFECOM.
- 2008 – Stuart Macleod became chief officer of the organisation.
- 2010 – Stuart Macleod resigned from chief officer, replaced by incumbent Chris Beattie.
- 2019/2020 review of the SASES – A review by SAFECOM of its services, including the SASES, was published in September 2019. The report aims to address the inefficiencies within the group of organisations, and work to make their services more integrated. Recommendations and improvements were suggested to leadership, governance, financial control, innovation, project delivery, policy advice, support, and emergency management. Following the review, Emergency Services minister Corey Wingard reported to Adelaide newspaper, The Advertiser, that he accepts all findings.
- 2021 – Headquarters will be relocated to the new Emergency Services Command Centre, alongside the Metropolitan Fire Services (MFS), Country Fire Services (CFS) and SAFECOM, with construction commencing in April 2020 with a budget of $14m AUD.

=== Notable emergency responses ===
- Cyclone Tracy (1974) – Following the cyclone, over 30,000 people were evacuated from Darwin to Adelaide. The SASES worked alongside the Red Cross in response to the disaster, giving evacuees assistance, guidance, and shelter.
- Ash Wednesday Fires I (1980) – The SASES's first major fire event warranted better preparation for future similar incidents, as at that time, they "had not been used to such incidents".
- Ash Wednesday Fires II (1983) – Following the previous Ash Wednesday fires, these fires were responded to more efficiently through a "more cohesive" management strategy between rural and metropolitan units.
- Northern South Australia Flooding (2007) – The SASES assisted prior to the flooding through sandbagging in community areas, evacuations through air searches and road rescues, and cleaning up communities in the aftermath.
- MH370 Air Search (2013) —The organisation sent 4 volunteers to assist in the international search for the aircraft wreck.
- 2016 South Australian Floods – The SASES responded to over 600 calls for assistance, and worked to fix power outages, flooding, and evacuations, with the most damage occurring in the south of Adelaide. The organisation opened a relief center for households with extreme damage.
- 2017 Queensland Cyclone Debbie – The SASES ran the South Australian assistance strategy to deal with the cyclone, sending various emergency services and specialists to Queensland to assist with recovery and response.
- Australian Bushfires (2019–2020) – The bush fire season saw devastation across South Australia, specifically in Kangaroo Island, where units volunteered to travel to the Island to assist the local unit and CFS with recovery and preparations. Following the bush fires, volunteers were thanked by the community through a range of events and initiatives, such as the 'parade of heroes' held at the Superloop Adelaide 500, alongside other emergency services.
- South Australian Storms (2022) – A series of significant storms impacted South Australia in late November 2022, resulting in mass power outages and significant flash flooding and storm damage. The suburbs of Flagstaff Hill, Blackwood, Coromandel Valley and Eden Hills were hit the hardest and subsequently generated over 1000 requests for assistance.

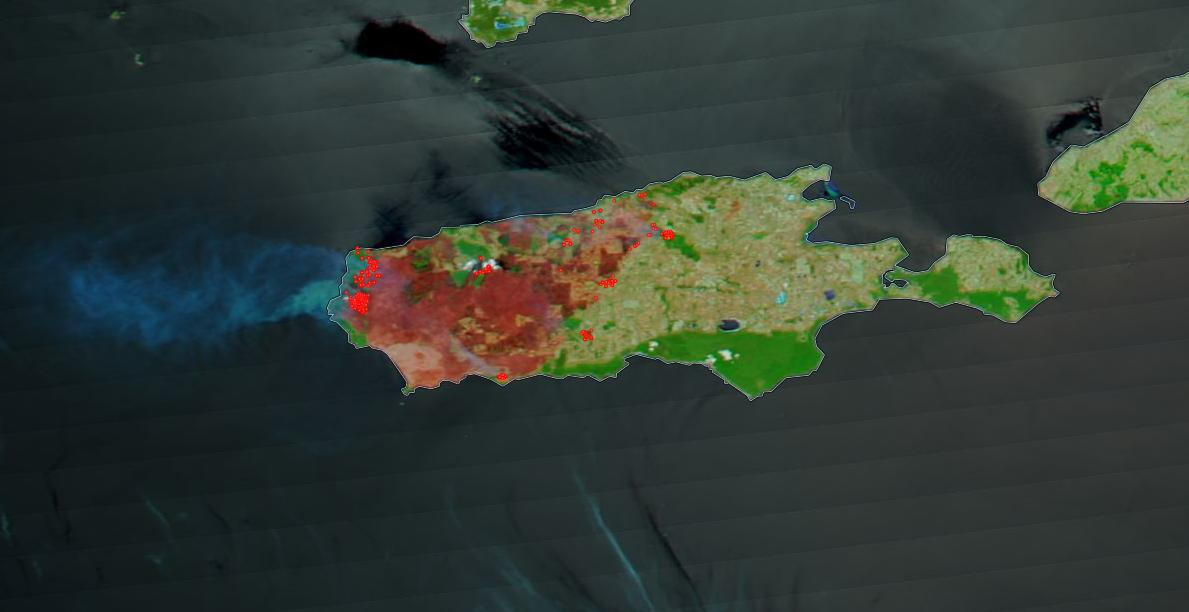
Aerial image of Kangaroo Island, South Australia during the 2019–2020 Australian bushfire season

== Responsibilities ==
The SASES helps communities prepare for and respond to emergency situations, both human-made and natural, and is the 'hazard leader' (co-ordinates all planning for risk prevention, preparedness, response and recovery) for extreme weather events. The State Emergency Plan also assigns the role of 'control agency' (takes charge of an emergency) for extreme weather and flood to the SASES as well as search and rescue-structure (USAR) which is shared between the SASES and MFS Threats of storms and flooding are the organisation's most frequented emergencies based on the number of hours volunteered in 2004. The SASES assist communities during these events by placing sandbags around buildings to prevent damage in preparation, helping with evacuations and rescues, and clearing obstacles that arise.

The organisation also assists other emergency services within the state such as the CFS, SA Police Force (SAPOL), and SA Ambulance Service. For example, the SASES assisted SAPOL in the water search for two missing fishermen off Cape Jaffa.

== Funding ==
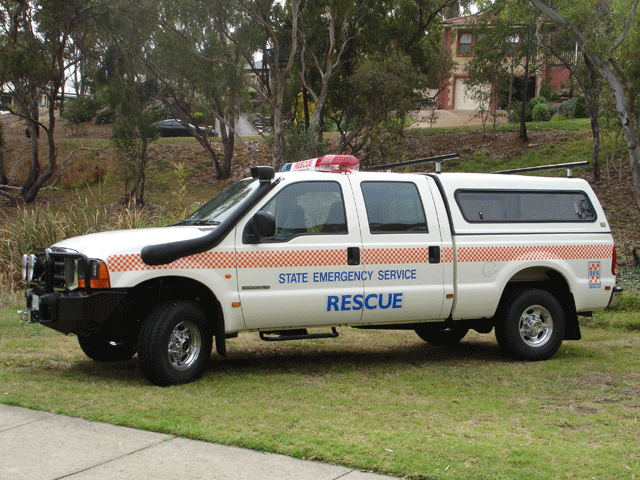
Vehicle used by the SASES, funded by the Emergency Services Levy

Before 1999, the organisation's income came from donations, loans, and sponsors.

In 1999, the Emergency Services Levy (ESL) was introduced in South Australia. This levy provides funding to emergency services throughout the state, including the SASES. The SASES largely uses their share of the levy for purchasing of equipment and vehicle, in addition to maintenance of units.

The levy is paid by the public based on ownership of land, dependent on size and location. In 2014 and 2015, the levy was increased, causing controversy within the state. These increases were distributed unevenly, based on who could afford the levy. However, many households do not pay this levy, and it was reported in 2014 that over 17,000 households had overdue payments worth over $11 million, which required further action.

In 2018, the SA state government reduced the levy by an average of $150 per household, costing approximately $360 million. In 2019, the levy was increased by $4.20 in response to "increased spending" in emergency services.

== Community engagement ==
The SASES has various community engagement strategies, such as social media and educational programs, aimed at increasing awareness of the organisation within communities, and helping communities better prepare and recover from disasters. These strategies and programs are also used to recruit volunteers.

The organisation has a specific Community Engagement Unit founded in 2012, whose role is to fulfill these goals and strategies.

=== Extreme Heat Strategy ===
The SASES leads emergency services within the state to prepare the public for heat waves and extreme weather. Various levels (Advice, Watch, and Warning) of temperature triggers are in place to initiate preparation by authorities, and it is the organisation's role to inform the public of any danger related to this, give tips on how to prepare and deal with danger, and inform the public of health services provided by other emergency services.

=== Wear Orange Wednesday ===
Each year, the community is encouraged to dress in orange to celebrate 'Wear Orange Wednesday (WOW)', a day of recognition for the services of the SASES, and other branches nationwide. Facebook profile picture filters, hashtags, and an orange light show on Adelaide Oval are also used to engage the community on this day.

=== SASES Rescue Challenges ===
The biennial challenge is publicised on the news, and social media, where SES units within the state compete in a series of mock emergency rescues. The challenge was routinely won by the Tea Tree Gully unit from 1992 to 2013, who continued to represent SASES in the National Disaster Rescue Challenges.

=== Recruitment ===
SASES volunteer numbers have declined in recent years. This is the largest in rural areas, with urban areas maintaining steady numbers. The SASES has responded through an active strategy to increase participation by 2020, with an emphasis on improving rural participation.

Diversity of volunteers and management is an issue that the organisation plans to overcome. In 2018, females made up 28% of the volunteer force, and 8% of volunteer managers. In response, the SASES is developing a formal diversity strategy alongside the Bushfires and Natural Hazards CRC to increase female and Indigenous Australian participation. This includes a partnership with the South Australian Health and Medical Research Institute (SAHMRI) to increase well-being, flexible schedules to help individual volunteers, and recruitment programs targeted at females (led by the community engagement unit).

==== Cadet Program ====
A cadet program was developed within recruitment. The minimum age requirement is 13 years old, the youngest of all SES branches. The program helps develop skills that school students would need as volunteers. Many cadets become volunteer members upon turning 18.

== Organisational structure ==
=== Units ===
The organisation is separated into 73 units, based on regions and special tasks (e.g. Community Engagement). Each unit is located within its region and is self-organised and managed. Based on the geography of their location, units specialise in operational tasks. For example, the Coober Pedy unit within the outback region of South Australia specialises in land search operations, road accident rescue, and underground rescue, suiting the mining industry within the town. A state headquarters in Adelaide CBD and regional headquarters (e.g. central region, east region) oversee the responsibilities of individual units.

=== Volunteers ===
The organisation is volunteer-based and currently has 1700 volunteers. Prospective members undertake training to prepare for different kinds of emergencies, and training continues during volunteering as the members become more experienced. Individual units also have training nights for their volunteers, typically one night a week. Volunteers are represented by the SASES Volunteers Organisation (SASESVA).

The volunteers represent the organisation through their well-known orange overall uniform. Volunteers are eligible to work for the SASES from the age of 18.

=== Membership of ACSES ===
Alongside other state branches of the SES, SASES is a member of the Australian Council of State Emergency Services (ACSES). Founded in 1995, each branch chief officer meets on the council to communicate information on their activities, as well as discuss state and national strategies.

== Awards and honours ==
=== Organisational Awards ===
In 2016, the SASES was a finalist in the Australian Training Awards, run by the Australian Government. Based on their training programs for volunteers, the award recognised the organisation's focus on safety and specialised training.

=== Volunteer Medals ===
The SASES awards various medals in accordance to SAFECOM's rewards scheme. All volunteers within the organisation can be nominated for review by the chief officer. SAFECOM then reviews all nominations before forwarding all shortlisted volunteers to the Emergency Services minister for final review. Various levels of medals are awarded.

==== National Medal ====
The highest of medals, this medal recognises long-term service to an emergency service organisation, such as the SASES. A minimum service of 15 years is required for the medal.

==== Emergency Services Medal (ESM) ====
This medal honours SES volunteers who have committed and excelled within their service to the organisation. The award extends beyond emergency management, and also considers those who have volunteered their time to education within the SES. The ESM is national in recognition.

==== SA Emergency Services Medal (SAESM) ====
Similar to the ESM, this medal recognises distinguished achievement and commitment to emergency service organisations, including the SASES, within South Australia. The SAESM considers acts of bravery when evaluating nominees for the award.

==== Long Service Medal ====
This medal honours individuals who have volunteered with the organisation for 10 years.

=== SASES Certificates of Recognition ===
The organisation also honours volunteers through certificates and volunteers are reviewed using the same process as medals.

==== Five Year Meritorious Service Certificate ====
This certificate recognises volunteers who have provided service to the organisation for 5 years.

==== Certificates of Appreciation ====
This certificate recognises the commitment of "volunteers, and staff, members of the public, businesses, charitable organisations, service clubs, employers and other benefactors" to the organisation.

==== Chief Officer’s Commendation ====
This certificate recognises volunteers committed to the organisation as recognised by the chief officer. Both acts related to specific events and ongoing commitment are considered.

=== Individual Unit Awards ===
Various units throughout the state also have internal awards and honours to recognise their volunteers.

==== Sturt Unit Awards ====
- Call Out Club – Various levels of gifts are awarded to volunteers after 100, 500, and 1000 call outs. This is to recognise their ongoing commitment to the unit. Alongside the gift for 1000 call outs, an engraved glass trophy is also given.
- Jarrod Munro Award – The memorial recognition award celebrates a volunteer's commitment and effort to the unit. The award is given quarterly and was previously named the star award.

== See also ==
- South Australian Country Fire Service
- Civil defense by country
