= State Emergency Service =

Volunteer emergency organisation in Australia

Agency overview
- Jurisdiction: Australia
- Employees: 20,000+

The State Emergency Service (SES) is the name used by a number of separate civil defence organisations in Australia that provide assistance during and after major incidents. Specifically, the services deal with fires, floods, storms and tsunamis, but can also assist in other emergencies, such as vertical and road crash rescues, missing person searches and medical evacuations.

The SES also has the capacity to respond to non-natural disasters, including nuclear, biological and chemical incidents. In other scenarios, the SES may act in a supporting capacity to assist other agencies, such as police and fire brigades. Most SES divisions are operational 24 hours a day. The SES is constituted as separate organisations under the various Australian states and territories. Eight of the SES organisations coordinate through the Australian Council of State and Territory Emergency Services (ACSES).

== History ==
During World War II the National Emergency Service was created on 1 February 1939 to provide air raid wardens. The organisation was disbanded six months after the end of the war.

The Civil Defence Service began in Australia in 1955. It was formed as a precaution to any potential attacks on Australian soil. The name was changed to the "State Emergency Service" during the 1970s, to reflect a change of emphasis into providing emergency help related to floods, storms and other natural emergencies.

Every state and territory in Australia has its own state (or territory) emergency service. Each state or territory is broken into regions, then units, and finally groups or teams. There are some 43,000 SES volunteers spread across the country.

The SES is one of many public safety organisations using AIIMS (Australasian Inter-Service Incident Management System). Typically, small (Level 1) incidents are assigned to a 'unit' and dealt with by a 'team' while larger and/or more complex (Level 2 or 3) incidents are coordinated at the regional level.

== Agency executives ==
Each SES has an executive appointed by the minister responsible in each jurisdiction.

Title	Name	Service
Commissioner	Mike Wassing	New South Wales State Emergency Service
Chief executive officer	Kate White (acting CEO)	Victoria State Emergency Service
Director	Leon Smith (acting)	Tasmania State Emergency Service
Chief Officer	Chris Beattie	South Australian State Emergency Service
Chief Officer	Steve Forbes	Australian Capital Territory State Emergency Service
Director	Andrew Warton	Northern Territory Emergency Service
Chief Officer	Position vacated in June/July 2026	Queensland State Emergency Service
Commissioner	Darren Klemm AFSM	Western Australia Department of Fire and Emergency Services

== Functions ==
The SES provides assistance to local communities in times of need. Because every community is different, every SES unit has a slightly different set of roles and activities. Depending on the needs of the local community, a unit may perform some or all of the following functions:

Function	Description
Agency Support (Operational)	Supporting other Emergency Services during incidents with lighting, human resources, marine transport, and other services.
Agency Support (Training)	Supporting other Emergency Services, agencies, and community organisations with member participation, resources, and welfare.
Air Observation – Search	Assisting in searches over land and sea from both helicopters and fixed-wing aircraft.
Air Observation – Intelligence	Gathering Flood Intelligence during events, emergency evacuation, remote area resupply, Reconnaissance of Flood and Storm effected areas.
Air Support Operations	Providing ground support for emergency aircraft pperations, notably the filling of water bomber aircraft during bushfire events.
Building Impact	Minor USAR operations caused by motor vehicles crashing into buildings. SES units provide shoring to these buildings and temporary building stabilisation.
Communication Support Unit	Provide communications support in difficult terrains. Install repeater radios and portable antennas. Coordinate other SES teams. Members are also trained to carry out the functions of other SES units.
Crowd and/or Traffic Control	Assisting police and ambulance at public events like Anzac Day in this capacity. Also assisting police with road closures during events like flooding and New Year celebrations.
Emergency services liaison	Working with representatives of other emergency services during emergencies.
Evacuation Centre Management	Establishing and running temporary evacuation centres.
Fire Support and Training	Assisting the police and the rural and metropolitan fire services with road closures, evacuations, delivery of welfare during major fires, and some training like first aid and chainsaw operations.
First Aid	Aiding members of the public requiring basic medical aid and assisting ambulance officers and members of St John Ambulance Australia with triage and mass casualty situations
Flood and storm preparation and response	Making temporary repairs and protecting property after floods and storms, helping people prepare for floods and storms and using specialised equipment like flood boats and chainsaws.
General rescue procedures and skills	Working safely to remove people from dangerous situations
Land Search	Searching for missing persons usually in both rural and suburban areas. Land search ranges from street based searches, to scrub and woodland areas as well as mountain rescue.
Management	Team which fill the administration roles at a unit level
Marine Rescue	Working with the Coast Guard and other marine organisations in assisting boats in distress
Media, public relations and community education	Working with the media and the public to communicate safety messages and warnings and to promote the SES to the community
Mines Rescue	Some SES units have specific training to allow them to rescue trapped persons from inside collapsed mines
Road-crash rescue	Providing mechanical intervention to crashed vehicles and extricating injured persons.
Swiftwater Rescue	Rescue/recovery of persons trapped in inland waterways or floodwater with skills applicable to fast-flowing water.
Training coordination	Helping to plan and carry out the training in a Unit. Nationally recognised subjects and courses are available to members.
Urban Search and Rescue (USAR)	Extending basic rescue techniques to situations such as collapsed or unstable structures, using specialised equipment such as after bombs or explosions
Vertical rescue	Rescuing people from heights and depths such as cliffs or ravines
Tsunami & earthquake response	Responding to and managing tsunami and earthquake events
Welfare	Providing and administrating temporary field bases for activations, including meals, peer support, teas and coffees etc. The SES also runs a "driver reviver" scheme that aims to reduce accidents caused by fatigued drivers.

== Funding ==
In addition to funds provided through annual budget legislation by federal, state and local governments, SES groups also supplement their financial resources with donations made by individuals and businesses, and through one off or recurring government grants. These grants and donations typically contribute to purchasing or maintaining group equipment, such as vehicles and tools, or to the improvement of SES property and facilities. Some states provide funding through a dedicated annual emergency services levy on households or properties, such as in South Australia.

== See also ==
- New South Wales State Emergency Service
- Australian Capital Territory Emergency Services Agency
- Queensland State Emergency Service
- Victoria State Emergency Service
- South Australian State Emergency Service
- Community Emergency Response Team
- Civil defence
