= South Australian Metropolitan Fire Service =

South Australian fire department

Operational area
- Country: Australia
- State: South Australia
- Jurisdiction: Greater Adelaide and other large metropolitan areas
- Address: Wakefield Street, Adelaide
- Coordinates: 34°55′43″S 138°36′19″E

Agency overview
- Established: 1862
- Employees: 1,000
- Staffing: Professional and Retained
- Chief Officer / CEO: Jeff Swann

Facilities and equipment
- Stations: 36; 20 metropolitan, 16 regional
- Fireboats: 1

Website
- Official website

The South Australian Metropolitan Fire Service (SAMFS) is the fire service for metropolitan and urban South Australia, as well as large townships. The Metropolitan Fire Service is constituted under the Fire and Emergency Services Act.

The MFS has 36 fire stations and over 1,000 personnel in Adelaide and across South Australia in major rural centres. It also has one marine vessel. The MFS has a series of responsibilities ranging from roadcrash rescue through to vertical rescue, confined space, land based swift water and urban search and rescue along with its key responsibility of firefighting. The MFS often work alongside other key stakeholders such as the State Emergency Service and the Country Fire Service, often with those agencies sharing stations. While the MFS is USAR qualified and maintains the USAR taskforce, the State Emergency Service makes up a key aspect of the USAR taskforce meaning if a USAR incident occurs they will be corresponded in order to make up the required numbers and resources to adequately attend the incident.

== History ==
The South Australian Fire Brigade was formed in 1862, following the passing of the Fire Brigades Act. In 1981 the service was renamed South Australian Metropolitan Fire Service when it became government funded.

== Fire Stations ==
=== Metropolitan Fire Stations ===
Station	Location	Appliances
20	Adelaide	201, 202, 203, 204, 205, 206, 2015, 2017, 2026, 2047, 2090, Car20, pods: P01, P02, P03, P06, P08, P09, P11, P12, P13, P32, P33, BF, BWC
21	Beulah Park	217
22	Paradise	229
24	Woodville	243, 249
25	Port Adelaide	257
27	Marine	2725,2714
28	Largs North	289
30	Oakden	301, 303
31	Golden Grove	319
32	Salisbury	321, 329, Car30
33	Elizabeth	331, 339
35	Gawler	359
36	Angle Park	369
37	Prospect	377
38	Angle Park/USAR	3817, pods: P34, P35, P44, BWC, EWP
40	St Mary's	401, 409
41	Camden Park	417
42	O'Halloran Hill^{[*]}	429
43	Noarlunga^{[*]}	433, 439, Car 40
44	Glen Osmond	449
45	Brooklyn Park^{[*]}	451
46	Seaford	469

=== Regional Fire Stations ===
Station	Location	Region	Appliances
50	Port Pirie	Yorke and Mid North	501, 502, 509, 5014, 5023
51	Port Augusta	Far North and Eyre	518, 519, 5114
52	Whyalla^{[*]}	Far North and Eyre	523, 528, 529, 5214, 5242
54	Port Lincoln	Far North and Eyre	5414, 5424, 543, 5442, 549
55	Peterborough	Far North and Eyre	5514, 559
60	Berri	Riverland and Central	601, 609, 6014, trailers: BAC, BF
61	Renmark	Riverland and Central	611, 618, 6114, 6142, trailer: PP
62	Loxton	Riverland and Central	6214, 628, 629, trailer: PP
63	Tanunda	Riverland and Central	631
64	Kapunda	Riverland and Central	641
66	Kadina	Yorke and Mid North	661
67	Wallaroo	Yorke and Mid North	671
68	Moonta	Yorke and Mid North	681, 6814
70	Mount Gambier	Limestone Coast	701, 703, 709, 7024
71	Victor Harbour	Limestone Coast	711, 719
72	Murray Bridge	Limestone Coast	721, 729
73	Mount Barker	Limestone Coast	731, 739, 7314

== Glossary/Callsigns ==
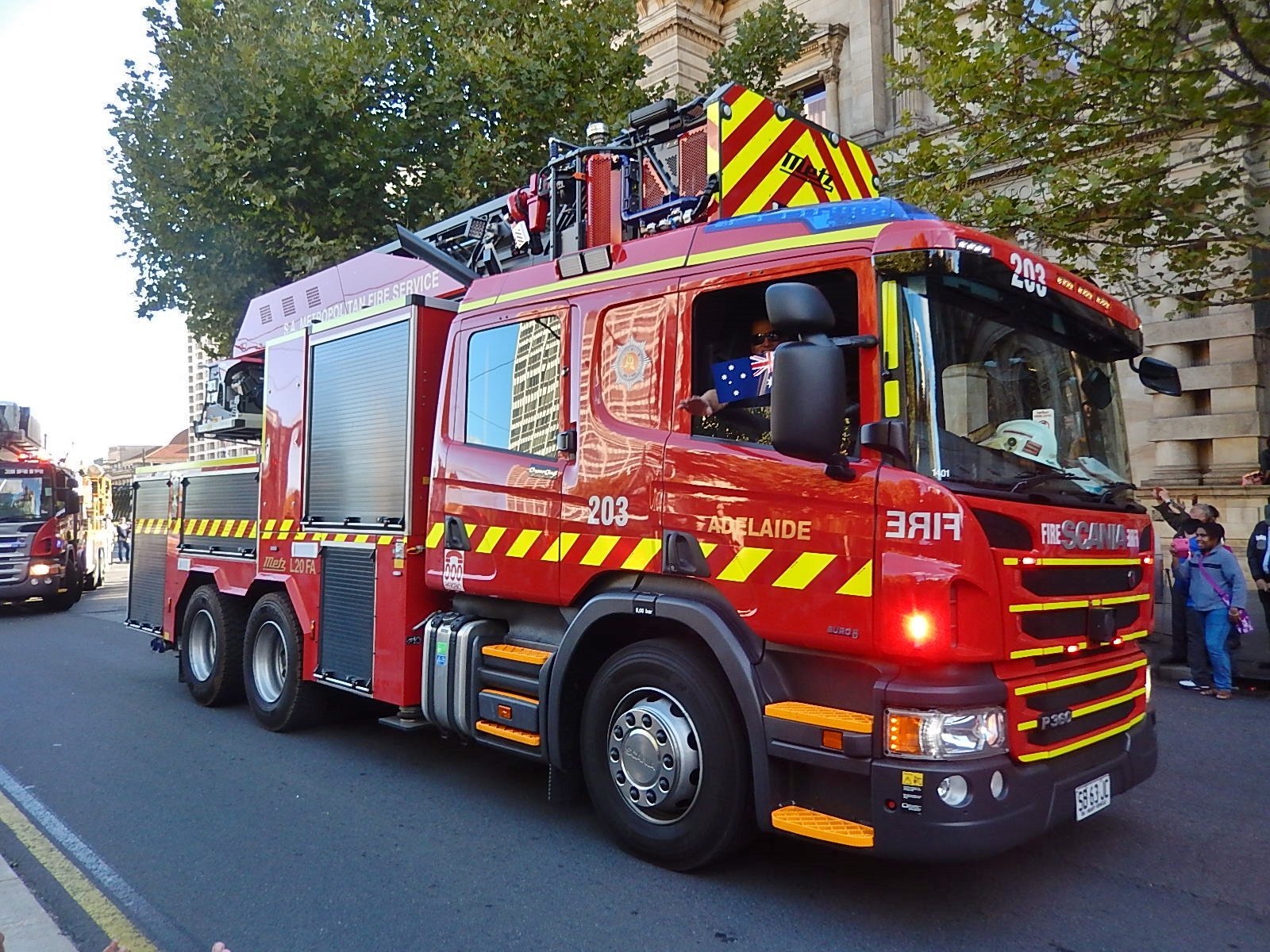
Scania CAPA Appliance

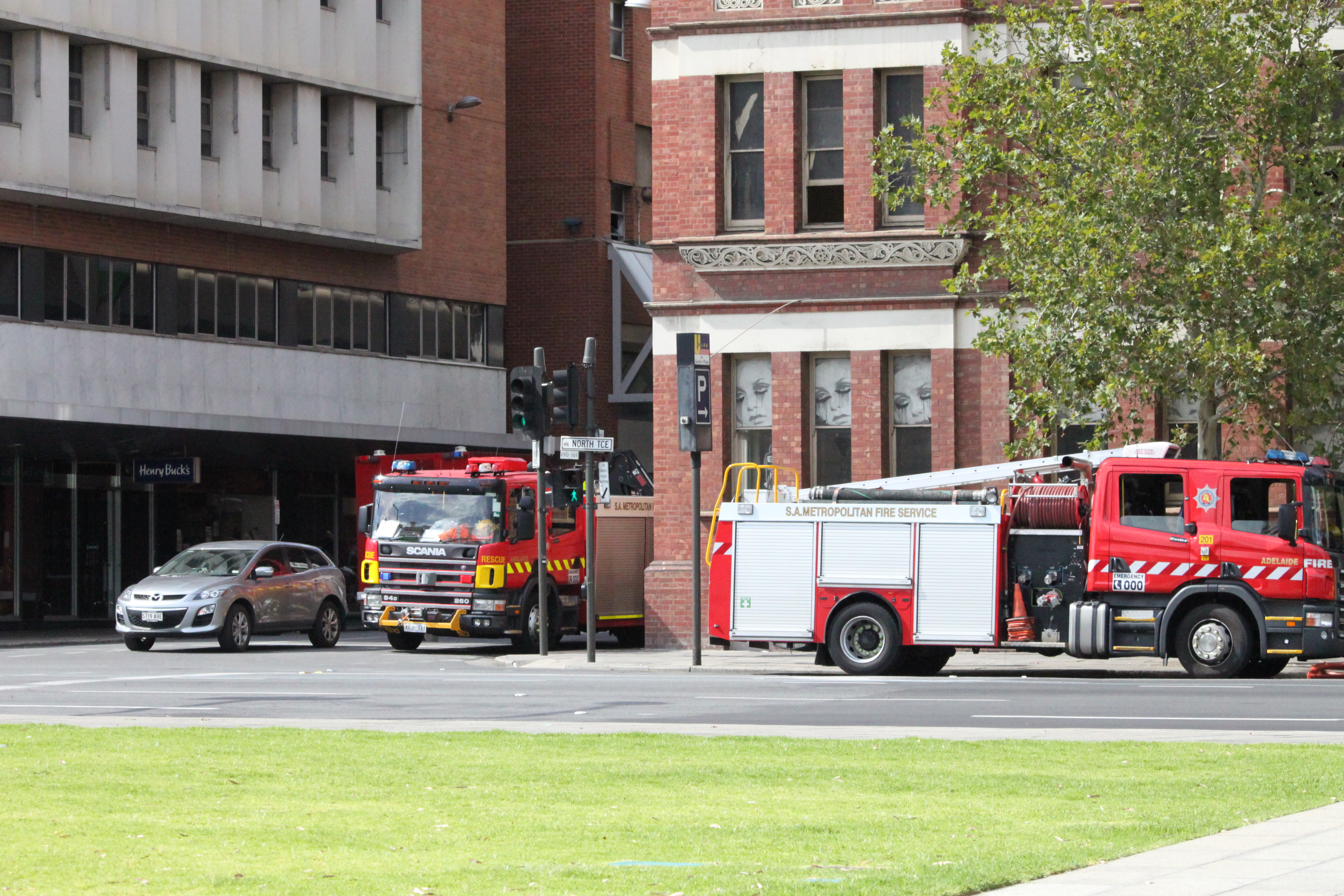
Fire trucks on scene in Adelaide

=== Appliances ===
- 1st Pumper: 201 / 301 / 321 / 331 / 401 / 451 / 501 / 511 / 601 / 611 / 631 / 641 / 661 / 671 / 701 / 711 / 721 / 731
- 2nd Pumper: 202 / 502 / 302
- CAPA (combined aerial pumper appliance): 203 / 243 / 303 / 433 / 523 / 543 / 703
- Technical Rescue: 204
- 1st Aerial Platform: 205
- Hazmat & Breathing Apparatus: 206
- Hazmat Support Unit: 2026
- Pumper – Hazmat: 217 / 257 / 377 / 417
- 4WD Pumper: 528 / 618 / 628
- Urban Rural Pumper: 5424 / 6824 / 7024
- Pumper – Rescue: 229 / 249 / 289 / 319 / 329 / 339 / 359 / 369 / 409 / 429 / 439 / 449 / 469 / 509 / 519 / 529 / 549 / 559 / 609 / 629 / 709 / 719 / 729 / 739
- Grass Fire Unit: 5014 / 5114 / 5214 / 5414 / 5514 / 6014 / 6114 / 7314
- 2nd Aerial Platform: 2015
- 1st Hook Lift: HOOKLIFT01 (20) / 3817 / 5023
- 2nd Hook Lift: HOOKLIFT02 (20)
- 3rd Hook Lift: HOOKLIFT03 (20)
- Fire Boat: 2725
- Bulk Water Carrier: 5242 / 6142
- Incident Command Bus: 2090
- Incident Commander: Car20 / Car68
- Incident Command Unit: Car30 / Car40

=== Pods ===
- Salvage (P01)
- 1st Flat Bed (P02)
- 1st Electricity Generator (P03)
- Hazmat & Breathing Apparatus (P06)
- General Purpose (P08)
- Mass Decontamination System (P09)
- Rehab (P11)
- Heavy Rescue (P12)
- Special Hazmat Support (P13)
- 2nd Flat Bed (P32)
- High Volume Hose (P33)
- 2nd Electricity Generator (P34)
- Toilet Facility (P35)
- Urban Search & Rescue (P44)
- Bulk Foam (BF)
- Bulk Water Carrier (BWC)
- Emergency Water Purification (EWP)

=== Trailers ===
- Breathing Apparatus Compressor (BAC)
- Bulk Foam (BF)
- Portable Pump (PP)

== See also ==
- South Australian Country Fire Service
- National Council for Fire & Emergency Services
