= Astro (Motorola) =

Two-way radio communications system

ASTRO 25 is a generation of ASTRO digital two-way radio communications by Motorola Solutions. Motorola first introduced digital two-way radio in the U.S. in 1991 under the name ASTRO Digital Solutions.

With the completion of the APCO Project 25 standard, Motorola introduced the ASTRO 25 solution and migrated its ASTRO Digital Solutions customers to ASTRO 25. Project 25 (also known as P25) is a suite of digital radio communications standards designed specifically for law enforcement, fire, and medical services to communicate with each other during emergencies.

ASTRO 25 is now the most widely used P25 mission-critical voice and data communication network in the world.

The Original ASTRO 25 format utilizes APCO Project 25 Phase I technology (FDMA). It is the most used format of the ASTRO 25 family of radio systems.

The ASTRO 25 Phase II system, which complies with the P25 Phase II standard, uses TDMA technology to deliver two voice channels over a single wireless trunking channel. The P25 standards do not yet support TDMA conventional operation. The ASTRO 25 network also ensures encryption key assignment over the system's radio channels and enhanced network security tools.

The ASTRO 25 digital radio system is claimed to provide superior audio quality and advanced features which complies with the Federal Communications Commission's 2013 narrowbanding requirements. ASTRO 25 currently operates in the 700 MHz, 800 MHz, 900 MHz, UHF and VHF bands for voice and data operation.

== History ==
Motorola has been selling car radio receivers to police departments and municipalities since 1930. The New Hampshire U.S. State Police were the first to test and use a conventional ASTRO Digital Solutions system. They began testing of ASTRO portable radios, mobile radios, base stations, dispatch consoles, and a wide-area system in December 1992 for State Police Troop A, and completed a phased installation several years later. This original ASTRO system was later converted to ASTRO 25.

Today, ASTRO 25 is widely used for public safety communications. ASTRO 25 enables federal, state, and local public safety agencies to achieve compatibility and communicate in emergencies and widespread disasters, such as Hurricane Katrina and the Boston Marathon bombing.

As of 2014, ASTRO 25 is used in over 60 countries and more than three dozen U.S. states.

== Mission Critical System ==
ASTRO 25 is a P25 standards-based mission critical network that provides integrated voice and data network communications for emergency response and coordinated communications during and after an incident. The ASTRO 25 network, two-way radios, and advanced applications work together.

The ASTRO 25 network and radios have been used during bushfires in Victoria in 2009, Superstorm Sandy, and wildfires in southeastern Texas in 2013.

== System Components ==
The ASTRO 25 core is the hub for the communications network. It comprises P25 portable and mobile radios, dispatch consoles, data applications, and RF conventional or trunked sites. In addition to ASTRO 25, Motorola also builds several other P25 radio models, including the APX family of radios, designed for first responders. With the ASTRO 25 core, organizations can deploy Motorola MCC 7500 and MCC 7500E IP Dispatch Consoles and have secure end-to-end encryption for all the radio traffic between operators and users in the field.

== ISSI: Connecting Multiple P25 Systems ==
In 2008, Motorola announced the first deployment of Inter RF Subsystem Interface (ISSI) gateways between live Project 25 public safety networks. The ISSI standard is a non-proprietary interface that allows two or more P25-compliant trunked systems to be connected—even if they are from different vendors or operating in different frequency bands. It extends the interoperability of radio systems without the need to fund super-large networks or install large, complex gateways.

Motorola installed an ISSI prototype in Arizona, USA. According to former Arizona Governor Janet Napolitano, "The Motorola ISSI gateway trial is an excellent example of driving innovation, which will enable our state with agency interoperability to protect our residents and visitors best."

In 2010, Motorola tested the ISSI equipment with five other emergency communications equipment manufacturers to demonstrate the effectiveness of P25 ISSI interoperability. The tests conducted on the ASTRO 25 system with the ISSI gateway confirmed that it could connect P25 systems and implement digital connectivity for emergency communications.

== TDMA: Doubling Voice Capacity for Public Safety ==
In 2011, Motorola deployed ASTRO 25 systems with P25 Time Division Multiple Access (TDMA) trunking to double the voice capacity of Frequency Division Multiple Access (FDMA) technology.

The P25 Phase 2 products were the first in the industry. By October 2013, over 30 customers had contracted for Motorola's P25 TDMA technology. By January 2014, 74 customers had been shipped to 106 zones licensed for TDMA.

With the City of Apopka, Florida, Motorola Solutions implemented the first deployment and acceptance of a dual mode ASTRO 25 system with P25 TDMA trunking for Apopka police, fire and emergency management personnel, and public works agencies. The system gives Apopka coverage and interoperability with surrounding agencies using 700 and 800 MHz frequencies without the need for adding frequency bands, antenna sites, or stations.

== Maintaining Information Assurance ==
ASTRO 25 solutions are designed for information assurance by preventing, detecting, and responding to external and internal risks. On January 19, 1996, Motorola was the first U.S. company to be granted FIPS 140-1 validation for its ASTRO subscriber encryption module, having been granted certificate number 2.

ASTRO 25 was the first to support federal grade security with FIPS 140-1 and CJIS compliant integrated data and comply with the U.S. Department of Defense (DOD) requirements for Criminal Justice Information System (CJIS); Department of Defense Information Assurance Certification and Accreditation (DiaCAP); Defense Information Systems Agency (DISA); Department of Defense Information Technology Security Certification and Accreditation Process (DitSCAP); Federal Information Processing Standards (FIPS); Federal Information Security Mandate Act (FiSMa); National Institute of Standards and Technology (NiSt) and NiSt-FIPS800 to identify security risks and vulnerabilities required by most Federal Agencies for themselves and their subcontractors.

== See also ==
- Land mobile radio system
