= Centronics (disambiguation) =

Centronics can mean:

- Centronics, a printer company that developed the parallel port standard
- IEEE 1284, the parallel interface standard that superseded the Centronics interface
- Micro ribbon connectors, used by Centronics for their parallel port and often known as Centronics connectors
