= Telecommunications Industry Association =

American telecommunications standards organization

- Abbreviation: TIA
- Formation: 1988

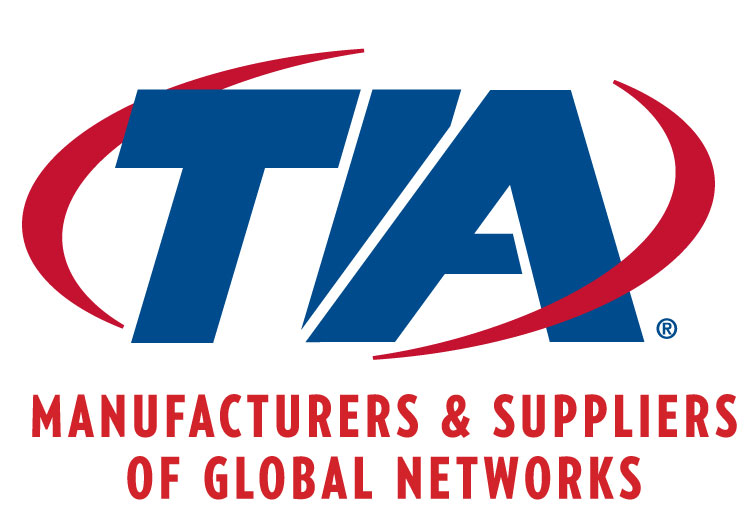
Logo of the Telecommunications Industry Association

The Telecommunications Industry Association (TIA) is accredited by the American National Standards Institute (ANSI) to develop voluntary, consensus-based industry standards for a wide variety of information and communication technology (ICT) products, and currently represents nearly 400 companies. TIA's Standards and Technology Department operates twelve engineering committees, which develop guidelines for private radio equipment, cellular towers, data terminals, satellites, telephone terminal equipment, accessibility, VoIP devices, structured cabling, data centers, mobile device communications, multimedia multicast, vehicular telematics, healthcare ICT, machine to machine communications, and smart utility networks.

Active participants include communications equipment manufacturers, service providers, government agencies, academic institutions, and end-users are engaged in TIA's standards setting process. To ensure that these standards become incorporated globally, TIA is also engaged in the International Telecommunication Union (ITU), the International Organization for Standardization (ISO), and the International Electrotechnical Commission (IEC).

TIA merged in 2017 with the Quest Forum, home of the TL9000 quality standard for operators, which substantially increased the number of companies under the TIA umbrella. The boards of the two organizations were combined into a single board. The headquarters of the combined organization was the TIA location in Arlington, Virginia.

== TIA Standards ==
The Telecommunications Industry Association's most widely adopted standards include:

1. TIA-942 Telecommunications Infrastructure Standard for Data Centers
2. TIA-568 (telecommunications cabling standards, used by nearly all voice, video and data networks).
3. TIA-569 Commercial Building Standards for Telecommunications Pathways and Spaces
4. TIA-607 (Commercial grounding - earthing - standards)
5. TIA-598 (Fiber optic color-coding)
6. TIA-222 Structural Standard for Antenna Supporting Structures and Antennas
7. TIA-602 Data Transmission Systems and Equipment, which standardized the common basic Hayes command set.
8. TIA-102 Land Mobile Radio (LMR) standards for APCO Project 25 (P25)

== Participating in TIA Standards Development ==
TIA encourages engineers who represent the manufacturers and/or users of network equipment technology products and services (from both the public and private sectors), to become engaged in TIA's engineering committees, by voting and submitting technical contributions for inclusion in future standards.

== Collaborative Activities ==
TIA is a participating standards organization of the ITU-T Global Standards Collaboration (GSC) initiative. The GSC has created a Machine-to-Machine Standardization Task Force (MSTF) to foster industry collaboration on standards across different vertical markets, such as finance, e-health, connected vehicles, and utilities.

== Legislation ==
TIA supported the E-LABEL Act (H.R. 5161; 113th Congress), a bill that would direct the Federal Communications Commission (FCC) to allow manufacturers of electronic devices with a screen to display information required by the agency digitally on the screen rather than on a label affixed to the device. Grant Seiffert argued that "by granting device manufacturers the ability to use e-labels, the legislation eases the technical and logistical burdens on manufactures and improves consumer access to important device information."
