= 20-pair colour code (Australia) =

Telecommunications colour code

The 20-pair colour code is a colour code used in Australia to identify individual conductors in a kind of electrical telecommunication wiring for indoor use, known as twisted pair cables. The colours are applied to the insulation that covers each conductor. The first colour is chosen from one group of five colours.

The combinations are also shown in the table below showing the colour for each wire ("1" and "2") and the pair number.

| 1–20 | | | 21–40 | | | 41–60 | | | 61–80 | | | 81–100 | | |
| Pair number | A leg (L+) | B leg (L−) | Pair number | A leg (L+) | B leg (L−) | Pair number | A leg (L+) | B leg (L−) | Pair number | A leg (L+) | B leg (L−) | Pair number | A leg (L+) | B leg (L−) |
|---|---|---|---|---|---|---|---|---|---|---|---|---|---|---|
| 1 | White | Blue | 21 | Yellow | Blue | 41 | Black | Blue | 61 | Violet | Blue | 81 | Red | Blue |
| 2 | White | Orange | 22 | Yellow | Orange | 42 | Black | Orange | 62 | Violet | Orange | 82 | Red | Orange |
| 3 | White | Green | 23 | Yellow | Green | 43 | Black | Green | 63 | Violet | Green | 83 | Red | Green |
| 4 | White | Brown | 24 | Yellow | Brown | 44 | Black | Brown | 64 | Violet | Brown | 84 | Red | Brown |
| 5 | White | Grey | 25 | Yellow | Grey | 45 | Black | Grey | 65 | Violet | Grey | 85 | Red | Grey |
| 6 | White | Blue–white | 26 | Yellow | Blue–white | 46 | Black | Blue–white | 66 | Violet | Blue–white | 86 | Red | Blue–white |
| 7 | White | Blue–orange | 27 | Yellow | Blue–orange | 47 | Black | Blue–orange | 67 | Violet | Blue–orange | 87 | Red | Blue–orange |
| 8 | White | Blue–green | 28 | Yellow | Blue–green | 48 | Black | Blue–green | 68 | Violet | Blue–green | 88 | Red | Blue–green |
| 9 | White | Blue–brown | 29 | Yellow | Blue–brown | 49 | Black | Blue–brown | 69 | Violet | Blue–brown | 89 | Red | Blue–brown |
| 10 | White | Blue–grey | 30 | Yellow | Blue–grey | 50 | Black | Blue–grey | 70 | Violet | Blue–grey | 90 | Red | Blue–grey |
| 11 | White | Orange–white | 31 | Yellow | Orange–white | 51 | Black | Orange–white | 71 | Violet | Orange–white | 91 | Red | Orange–white |
| 12 | White | Orange–green | 32 | Yellow | Orange–green | 52 | Black | Orange–green | 72 | Violet | Orange–green | 92 | Red | Orange–green |
| 13 | White | Orange–brown | 33 | Yellow | Orange–brown | 53 | Black | Orange–brown | 73 | Violet | Orange–brown | 93 | Red | Orange–brown |
| 14 | White | Orange–grey | 34 | Yellow | Orange–grey | 54 | Black | Orange–grey | 74 | Violet | Orange–grey | 94 | Red | Orange–grey |
| 15 | White | Green–white | 35 | Yellow | Green–white | 55 | Black | Green–white | 75 | Violet | Green–white | 95 | Red | Green–white |
| 16 | White | Green–brown | 36 | Yellow | Green–brown | 56 | Black | Green–brown | 76 | Violet | Green–brown | 96 | Red | Green–brown |
| 17 | White | Green–grey | 37 | Yellow | Green–grey | 57 | Black | Green–grey | 77 | Violet | Green–grey | 97 | Red | Green–grey |
| 18 | White | Brown–white | 38 | Yellow | Brown–white | 58 | Black | Brown–white | 78 | Violet | Brown–white | 98 | Red | Brown–white |
| 19 | White | Brown–grey | 39 | Yellow | Brown–grey | 59 | Black | Brown–grey | 79 | Violet | Brown–grey | 99 | Red | Brown–grey |
| 20 | White | Grey–white | 40 | Yellow | Grey–white | 60 | Black | Grey–white | 80 | Violet | Grey–white | 100 | Red | Grey–white |

The Australian standard specifies grey in Tables B2 to B7. There are systems in other countries where slate is used rather than grey. This is perceived as a minimisation of confusion between green and grey and their potential abbreviations: G, Gr, or Gre. No such consideration is made for black, blue, or brown, or their potential abbreviations of B, Bl, or Br.

== Sources ==
- www.commsalliance.com.au

== See also ==
- 25-pair colour code
