= Statewide government trunked radio systems in Australia =

The Government Radio Network (GRN) is a network of various systems in place across Australia that enable statewide trunked radio communication. The network operates through inter-linked sites for government and public services such as police, ambulance, fire, or roads authorities which require such a system to function properly. The main aim of the GRN is to consolidate all resources into one network, ensuring greater coverage and reliability than if each department had its own independent communication system. The existence of the GRN also reduces the amount of government money and resources needed to maintain communication between units of emergency and public service branches. Last, it allows effective intercommunication among these services in times of national or state emergency for coordination of wide-scale actions.

== Australian Capital Territory Radio Network (TRN) ==
The Australian Capital Territory Radio Network (commonly referred to as the TRN) is a trunked radio system operating in the Australian Capital Territory. The network was introduced in 2004, and provides 100% coverage of the ACT. The network is used by ACT Emergency Services Agencies (ESA) and other Government of the Australian Capital Territory agencies including ACTION, Transport Canberra & City Services, ACT Health and Roads ACT.

The network is part of the NSW GRN, and is controlled and maintained as part of that network. It is managed separately by the ACT Government.

== New South Wales Public Safety Network (NSW PSN) ==
=== Overview ===
The New South Wales Public Safety Network (previously referred to as the New South Wales Government Radio Network or NSW GRN) is a trunked radio system operating in the state of New South Wales. Established in 1993, the network was the first government trunked radio network in Australia and is one of the largest in the world. The NSW GRN covers more than 80% of New South Wales and approximately 96% of the urban population. The network is owned by the Government of New South Wales through the NSW Telco Authority and the network's operations are managed under contract.

=== Network Users ===
The network is used by all NSW and ACT emergency services in varying capacities, along with other agencies, departments, services, and non-government organisations, including:

- Fire and Rescue NSW
- NSW Ambulance
- NSW Rural Fire Service
- VRA Rescue NSW
- Marine Rescue NSW
- NSW State Emergency Service
- NSW Police Force
- ACT Emergency Services
- Department of Attorney General and Justice
- RailCorp
- Transport for NSW (formerly Roads & Traffic Authority and NSW Maritime, then Roads & Maritime Services)
- Sydney Ferries
- Corrective Services NSW
- NSW Department of Juvenile Justice
- NSW National Parks & Wildlife Service
- Ausgrid
- Endeavour Energy
- Hunter Water
- Sydney Water
- WaterNSW
- Property NSW
- Sydney Ports Corporation
- Central Tablelands County Councils
- Sutherland Shire Council
- Child Flight
- Australian Broadcasting Corporation
- Chevra Hatzolah (Jewish Community sponsored and staffed medical response)

The network is also used by other government departments and discrete law enforcement agencies.

=== Network Information ===
The network is a digital 9600 bps Project 25 (commonly referred to as P25 or APCO-25) Phase 2 trunked radio system operating in the UHF band between 403 MHz and 430 MHz in 12.5 kHz steps. End user equipment is supplied mostly by Motorola, and consists primarily of Motorola APX series mobiles and portables two-way radios (although Benelec, Tait Communications and Simoco radios are also authorised for use). Encryption is supported and used by some agencies on the network.

== Northern Territory Emergency Services Trunk Network (NTESTN) ==
The Northern Territory Emergency Services Trunk Network is a trunked radio system operating in the Northern Territory. The network is a digital Project 25 Phase 1 trunked radio system operating in the lower UHF band.

== Queensland Government Wireless Network (GWN) ==
=== Overview ===
The Queensland Government Wireless Network (referred to as the GWN) is a trunked radio system operating in the state of Queensland. The network was built and is currently managed by Telstra under contract. The network commenced operation in 2014, and was operational for the 2014 G20 Brisbane summit. Following that event, the network was re-purposed and is now the main communications network for emergency services in South East Queensland.

=== Network Users ===
The network provides secure radio communications for Queensland's public safety agencies. These users include:

- Queensland Ambulance Service
- Queensland Fire Department
- Queensland Police Service
- Queensland State Emergency Service
- Surf Life Saving Queensland

=== Network Information ===
The network is a digital Project 25 (known as P25 or APCO-25) Phase 2 trunked radio system operating in the UHF band. End user equipment is supplied by Motorola. Encryption is used by all network users.

== South Australia Government Radio Network (SAGRN) ==
=== Overview ===
The SA Government Radio Network (referred to as the SAGRN) is a trunked radio system operating in the state of South Australia.

The SAGRN is one of the largest and most comprehensive public safety networks in the world, covering over 265,000 square kilometres and providing coverage to more than 99.5% of South Australia’s population including 20km offshore coverage along the state's coast.

The SAGRN includes a statewide Paging network that is used for the dispatch of Ambulance, MFS, CFS and SES resources. The Paging network is integrated with the Computer Aided Dispatch system used at the Triple Zero Emergency Operations Centres.

Telstra originally constructed the SAGRN in the early 2000's, the network replaced 28 separate systems. Telstra supported the network until 2010.

In 2010, Motorola entered into a contract with the South Australian Government to support the SAGRN.

In 2015, Motorola entered into contracts to upgrade the SAGRN and operate it.

=== Network Users ===
The SAGRN is used by over 25 government and non-government agencies including

- SA Ambulance Service
- South Australia Police
- South Australian Metropolitan Fire Service
- South Australian Country Fire Service
- South Australian State Emergency Service
- SA Water
- SA Power Networks
- Adelaide Metro
- Department for Correctional Services
- Royal Flying Doctor Service
- St John Ambulance Australia
- Surf Life Saving Australia

The network is also used by other government departments and law enforcement agencies.

=== Network Information ===
The SAGRN Voice Network is a digital Project 25 (known as P25 or APCO-25) Phase 1 trunked radio system operating in the Harmonised Government Spectrum in the UHF band.

The SAGRN Voice network is built on Motorola Astro-25 network equipment.

P25 Voice terminal equipment is supplied via a panel of suppliers of compatible P25 radios.

== Tasmanian Government Radio Network (TasGRN) ==
=== Overview ===
The Tasmanian Government Radio Network (TasGRN) is a project to establish a single digital communications network for a number of Government of Tasmania organisations.

=== Network Users ===
The network provides secure radio communications for Tasmania's public safety agencies and some of its Government Business Enterprises. These users include:

- Tasmania Police
- Ambulance Tasmania
- Tasmania Fire Service
- State Emergency Service
- Hydro Tasmania
- TasNetworks
- Sustainable Timber Tasmania
- Tasmania Parks and Wildlife Service

=== Network Information ===
The network is a digital Project 25 (known as P25 or APCO-25) Phase 2 trunked radio system operating in both the VHF and UHF bands.

End user equipment is supplied by Motorola.

Encryption is used full time by all Public Safety users and part time for other users. TasNetworks and Hydro Tasmania don't use encryption for day to day operations.

== Victorian Government Radio Networks ==
The Victorian Radio Network (VRN) is an umbrella term used to describe Victoria’s statewide public safety radio communications network, comprising both the Metropolitan Mobile Radio (MMR) and Regional Mobile Radio (RMR) systems. Although the two networks operate across different frequency bands, coverage areas, and radio zones, they function as a single interoperable Project 25 (P25) trunked radio system supporting emergency services and government agencies throughout Victoria.

=== Metropolitan Mobile Radio (MMR) ===
The Metropolitan Mobile Radio (MMR) service is a Project 25 (APCO-25) Phase 1 radio voice communications system. It provides communications over the Greater Metropolitan area supporting Victoria Police, Ambulance Victoria and the Metropolitan Fire and Emergency Services Board.

The current users are limited to Emergency Services which are:

- Victoria Police (encrypted)
- Ambulance Victoria (encrypted as of July 2019)
- Victoria State Emergency Service
- Corrections Victoria
- Life Saving Victoria
- Fire Rescue Victoria

All digital scanning receivers are able to decode the unencrypted conventional P25 channels. End user equipment is supplied by Motorola, primarily XTS5000 portables and XTL5000 mobiles.

=== Regional Mobile Radio (RMR) ===
The Regional Mobile Radio (RMR) network is a digital VHF P25 (Phase I & II) trunking network managed by Telstra. The RMR was initially designed as the Regional Radio Dispatch Service (RRDS) Project for the Country Fire Authority (CFA).

Towards the end of June 2013 the first two trunking sites were switched on for the RMR with all CFA bridges transitioned by August 2014 to the RMR that will become the primary communications system for contacting fire dispatchers used by the CFA. Augmenting its older Analogue VHF Network the RMR network is being used for incident dispatching and emergency communications with statewide fire dispatchers with the older analogue VHF network being slowly decommissioned or repurposed and analogue simplex radio communications being used for local and fire ground radio communications.

In 2016, it was announced that regional Victoria Police would transition to the network with encryption. The transition was successfully completed to encrypted communications on the morning of 20 November 2018. The Victoria State Emergency Services, Life Saving Victoria and Corrections Victoria will also transition.

The current users of the network are:

- Country Fire Authority
- Fire Rescue Victoria
- Victoria Police (Encrypted)
- Ambulance Victoria
- Victoria State Emergency Service
- Corrections Victoria
- Life Saving Victoria

The current end user equipment used by the CFA is supplied by Tait Communications and consists of custom CFA branded TM9100s and TP9100s.

The current end user equipment used by the State Emergency Service is supplied by Motorola Solutions and Telstra and consists of Motorola APX 7500 VHF/UHF Mobile and Motorola APX 8000 Portable radios.

The current end user equipment used by Victoria Police is supplied by Motorola Solutions and Telstra and consists of Motorola APX 8500 Mobile and APX 8000H Portable radios.

=== Victorian StateNet Mobile Radio Network (SMR) ===
The Victorian StateNet Mobile Radio network is a MPT1327 trunked radio system owned by Telstra. As of February 2024, Telstra has indicated it will shut down the SMR by 30 June 2026.

It consists of 101 base sites which are strategically positioned to provide 96% coverage of the state to its users. PSTN interconnect features are available, with calls possible from radio to mobile telephones & landlines and vice versa.

Frequency allocation for this network starts at 163.0625 MHz to 165.6875Mhz (channel spacing of 12.5 kHz).

There are many government and commercial users of this network, some of which include:

- Telstra
- Yarra Valley Water
- City West Water
- AusNet
- V/Line
- Sheriff's Office
- FFMV (Forest Fire Management Victoria), comprising Department of Environment & Primary Industries, and Parks Victoria
- VicRoads
- Ambulance Victoria (Rural) (As of July 2023, migrating to RMR
- Numerous Taxi Companies
- State Aircraft Unit

Former users include:

- Victoria Police
- Corrections Victoria
- Life Saving Victoria
- Victoria State Emergency Service (Migrated to RMR)
- Country Fire Authority (Migrated to RMR)

The network includes a web-portal based reports system called Telstra Hosted Online Reporting (THOR). This feature allows users to track their individual network usage in greater detail.

While a small number of users employ analog frequency inversion voice scrambling, the vast majority of voice traffic on the network is clear.

There are no commercially available scanning receivers able to directly track MPT1327 networks, following voice conversations is possible using freely available decoding software such as Trunkview and a compatible scanner.

Most of the current end user equipment is supplied by Motorola and consists primarily of MCS2000s, MTS2000s, MCX760s and PTX760s.

== Western Australia Police Radio Network ==
The Western Australia Police Radio Network is an encrypted Project 25 (APCO-25) Phase 1 digital trunked radio system operating in Western Australia. The network commenced operation in 2011, and currently provides coverage to 20,000 square kilometres around Perth, and 25,000 square kilometres around regional areas, equating to 95% of the WA population. The network is used by the Western Australia Police Force and the Department of Justice.

In December 2020, the state government announced plans for a new emergency services radio network.
