= Telco cable =

A telco cable

A telco cable, also known as a Telecom cable or Amphenol cable, is a thick cable used for connecting multiple voice or data lines for LANs or telecommunications. The ends use 25 pairs of polarized pins (50 pins total). This cable handles up to 25 data channels or phone lines. The name Amphenol comes from the company that first manufactured it.

Most phone systems use this type of cable. The common color is gray and made of polyvinyl chloride (PVC). Most manufactures have standardized on this color for this material. Another standardized color is white, usually associated with plenum cable. Plenum cable is cable used in plenum spaces of buildings. The plenum /ˈplɛnəm/ is the space used for air circulation for heating and air conditioning systems, by providing a location for ductwork. Space between the structural ceiling and the dropped ceiling or under a raised floor is typically considered plenum. Some drop ceiling designs create a tight seal that does not allow for airflow and therefore may not be considered a plenum air-handling space.

The telco cable is also associated with pre-wired 66 blocks pre-assembled with an RJ-21 female connector are available that accept a quick connection to a 25-pair cable with a male end. These connections are typically made between the block and the CPE (customer premises equipment).

== See also ==
- Micro ribbon
- RJ21
- 25-pair color code
