= TIA-598-C =

Standard for color-coding optical fiber cables

The Telecommunications Industry Association's TIA-598-C Optical Fiber Cable Color Coding is an American National Standard that provides all necessary information for color-coding optical fiber cables in a uniform manner. It defines identification schemes for fibers, buffered fibers, fiber units, and groups of fiber units within outside plant and premises optical fiber cables. This standard allows for fiber units to be identified by means of a printed legend. This method can be used for identification of fiber ribbons and fiber subunits. The legend will contain a corresponding printed numerical position number and/or color for use in identification.

TIA-598-C replaced the previous issue of ANSI/EIA/TIA Standard 598, dated 2001. Changes included the following: designation of Aqua (AQ) as the jacket color for indoor cable containing laser-optimized (LO) 50/125 μm MM optical fiber designation, and of Blue (BL) as jacket color for indoor cable containing polarization-maintaining fiber; expanding the color definition for Slate (SL); and adding color definitions from ANSI/EIA Standard 359-A, colors for Color Identification and Coding, for reference.

Fiber Color Codes Chart
Fiber Number	Color
1	Blue
2	Orange
3	Green
4	Brown
5	Slate
6	White
7	Red
8	Black
9	Yellow
10	Violet
11	Rose
12	Aqua

For more than 12 fibers, the color codes are repeated and striped with black (except black, which is striped with yellow). Every twelve adds one stripe.
