= 25-pair color code =

Form of color code used in wiring

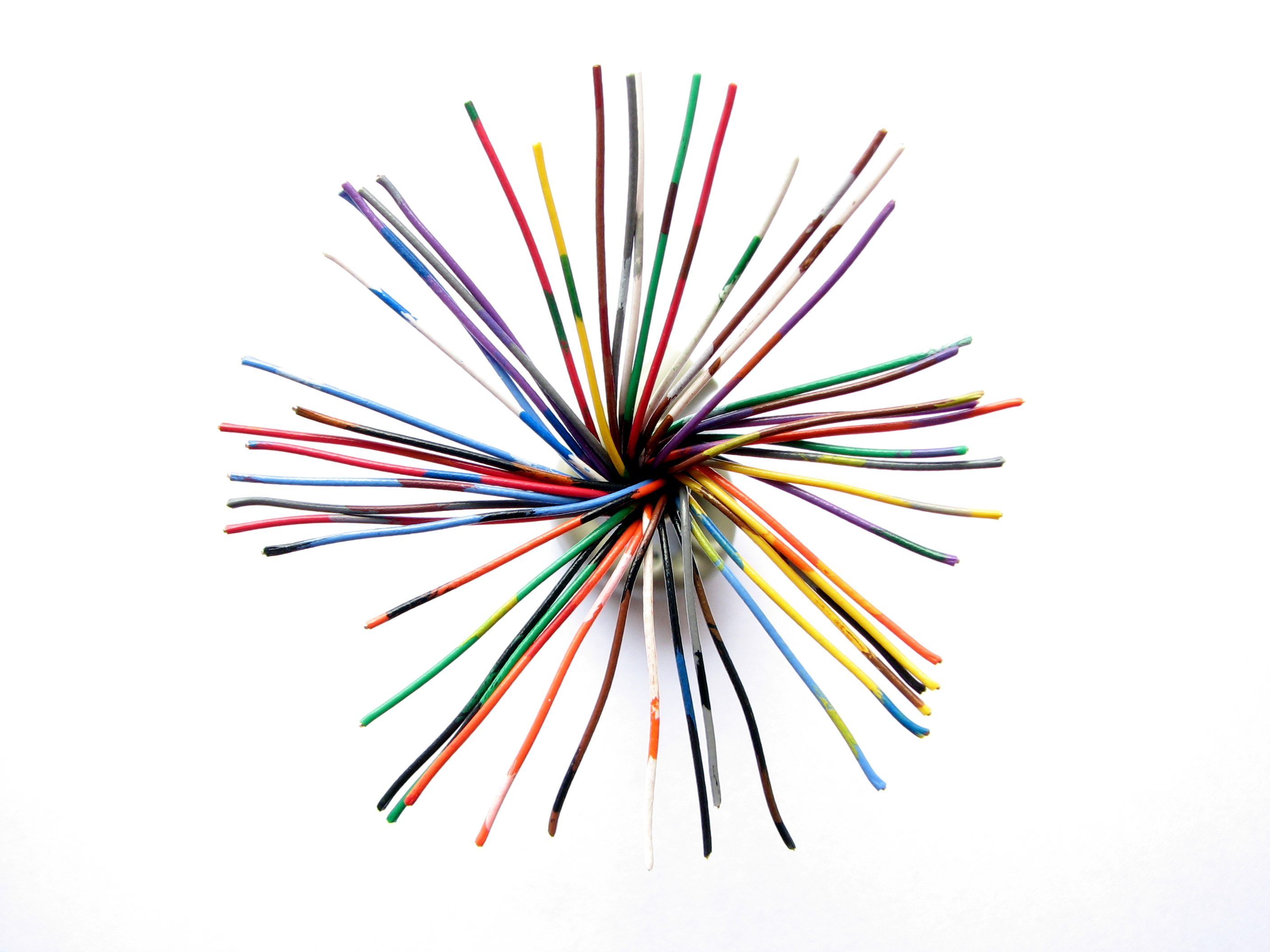
Single-core 25-pair/50 conductor cable

The 25-pair color code, originally known as even-count color code, is a color code used to identify individual conductors in twisted-pair wiring for telecommunications.

== Color coding ==
With the development of new generations of telecommunication cables with polyethylene-insulated conductors (PIC) by Bell Laboratories for the Bell System in the 1950s, new methods were developed to mark each individual conductor in cables. Each wire is identified by the combination of two colors, one of which is the major color, and the second the minor color. Major and minor colors are chosen from two different groups of five, resulting in 25 color combinations. The color combinations are applied to the insulation that covers each conductor. Typically, one color is a prominent background color of the insulation, and the other is a tracer, consisting of stripes, rings, or dots, applied over the background. The background color always matches the tracer color of its paired conductor, and vice versa.

The major, or primary group of colors consists of the sequence of white, red, black, yellow, and violet (mnemonics Why Run Backwards, You'll Vomit). The minor, or secondary color is chosen from the sequence blue, orange, green, brown, and slate (mnemonics Bell Operators Give Better Service).

25-pair color coding using twisted pairs with solid color coding only, without tracers. This method was rarely used.

25-pair color code
Pair no.	Major color	Minor color
1	White	Blue
2	White	Orange
3	White	Green
4	White	Brown
5	White	Slate
6	Red	Blue
7	Red	Orange
8	Red	Green
9	Red	Brown
10	Red	Slate
11	Black	Blue
12	Black	Orange
13	Black	Green
14	Black	Brown
15	Black	Slate
16	Yellow	Blue
17	Yellow	Orange
18	Yellow	Green
19	Yellow	Brown
20	Yellow	Slate
21	Violet	Blue
22	Violet	Orange
23	Violet	Green
24	Violet	Brown
25	Violet	Slate

The wire pairs are referenced directly by their color combination, or by the pair number. For example, pair 9 is also called the red-brown pair. In technical tabulations, the colors are often suitably abbreviated.

Violet is the standard name in the telecommunications and electronics industry, but it is sometimes referred to as purple. Similarly, slate is a particular shade of gray. The names of most of the colors were taken from the conventional colors of the rainbow or optical spectrum, and in the electronic color code, which uses the same ten colors, albeit in a different order.

When used for plain old telephone service (POTS), the first wire is known as the tip or A-leg (U.K.) conductor, and is usually connected to the positive side of a direct current (DC) circuit, while the second wire is known as the ring lead or B-leg (U.K.), and is connected to the negative side of the circuit. Neither of these two sides of the line has a connection to the local ground. This creates a balanced audio circuit with common-mode rejection, also known as a differential pair. The tip and ring convention is based on the 1/4″ (6.5 mm) TRS phone connectors, which were employed in telephone switchboards in the 19th and 20th centuries, where the tip contact of the connector is separated from the ring contact by a spacer of insulation. The connection furthest from the cable is known as the tip, the middle connection is the ring, and the (largest) connection closest to the wire is the sleeve.

== 25-pair telco cable pinout ==
A common application of the 25-pair color code is the cabling for the Registered Jack interface RJ21, which uses a female 50-pin miniature ribbon connector, as shown in the following table. The geometry of the pins of the receptacle (right hand image) corresponds to the pin numbers of the table. The left column of pins are the ring (R) conductors, while all tip (T) conductors are on the right.

Color (minor/major)	(R)	(T)	Color (major/minor)	The corresponding pin order in the female RJ21 connector
Color (minor/major)	Pin No.		Color (major/minor)	The corresponding pin order in the female RJ21 connector
blue/white	1	26	white/blue	
orange/white	2	27	white/orange	
green/white	3	28	white/green	
brown/white	4	29	white/brown	
slate/white	5	30	white/slate	
blue/red	6	31	red/blue	
orange/red	7	32	red/orange	
green/red	8	33	red/green	
brown/red	9	34	red/brown	
slate/red	10	35	red/slate	
blue/black	11	36	black/blue	
orange/black	12	37	black/orange	
green/black	13	38	black/green	
brown/black	14	39	black/brown	
slate/black	15	40	black/slate	
blue/yellow	16	41	yellow/blue	
orange/yellow	17	42	yellow/orange	
green/yellow	18	43	yellow/green	
brown/yellow	19	44	yellow/brown	
slate/yellow	20	45	yellow/slate	
blue/violet	21	46	violet/blue	
orange/violet	22	47	violet/orange	
green/violet	23	48	violet/green	
brown/violet	24	49	violet/brown	
slate/violet	25	50	violet/slate	

== Larger cables ==
For cables with more than 25 pairs, each group of 25 is called a binder group. The binder groups are marked with mylar ribbons using the same color coding system, starting with a white/blue ribbon, then a white/orange ribbon, and so on. The 24th binder group has a violet/brown ribbon, completing a super binder of 600 pairs.

In cables of more than 600 pairs, each of the 600-pair super binder group bundles is wrapped with a mylar binder ribbon, or string, matching the "tip" colors of the color code, starting with white. The pattern then starts over with the first 25-pair group as white/blue, and continues indefinitely, in multiples of 600 pairs or parts thereof. For example, a 900-pair cable has the first 600 pairs in 24 groups of 25 pairs in a white binder, and the remaining 300 pairs in 12 groups of 25 pairs wrapped in a red binder.

Some cables are "mirrored" or "clocked" with a pattern that is known throughout the telephone industry. Starting with the first binder group in the center, the technician counts the cable's groups in a spiral direction depending on the location of the central office or switch. If looking at the cable's core and the switch is in that direction, the groups are counted counter-clockwise. If the cable is the field side, the count is clockwise. There are indicators on the mylar ribbons to know where to begin for each layer and a diagram for the different cable sizes should be readily available for reference.

Other color schemes are sometimes used for outdoor cables, particularly outside the U.S., but this color code is common for aerial and underground cables up to several thousand pairs in North America. In the UK, the British Post Office (later BT) used this color code for what is now known loosely as CW1308 specification cables, referring to the Post Office's "Cable and Wire" specification No. 1308.

== Extra pairs and colors ==
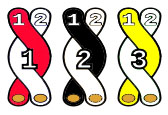
Colors of additional pairs in multi-pair cable as per Bell Standards

When working on aerial cable splicing and installation, it is common to use a telephone lineman's set or "butt set" to communicate over long distances. To facilitate this, extra pairs of wires are embedded in cables using "major" colors for both wires (instead of the major/minor color combinations used for the rest). One extra pair (red-white) may be embedded into cables that are 6 to 75 pairs; two pairs (red-white and black-white) may be encapsulated in cables of 100 to 300 pairs; and three pairs (red-white, black-white, and yellow-white) may be included in cables of 400 to 900 pairs. These extra pairs are often referred to as "talk pairs" and are never used for subscriber service.

== Other color codings ==
=== Inside quad wiring ===
Older Bell System wiring inside customer premises used a cable type with four conductors of solid copper wire with the insulation colors red, green, yellow, and black (legacy) or a two-color code of blue, orange, and white.

green	white/blue	Pair 1 tip
red	blue/white	Pair 1 ring
black	white/orange	Pair 2 tip
yellow	orange/white	Pair 2 ring

=== Optical cable ===
A color coding method used for fiber-optic cables, TIA-598-C, starts with the same first ten colors, adding the color rose for 11, and aqua for 12.

== See also ==
- 20-pair colour code (Australia)
