= TIA-942 =

Specification of the minimum requirements for data center infrastructure

The Telecommunications Industry Association (TIA) ANSI/TIA-942-C Telecommunications Infrastructure Standard for data centers is an American National Standard (ANS) that specifies the minimum requirements for data center infrastructure and is often cited by companies such as ADC Telecommunications and Cisco Systems. The standard was updated to revision C in May 2024 by the TIA TR-42.1 Engineering Committee of industry experts.

The ANSI/TIA-942-C specification references private and public domain data center requirements for data center infrastructure elements such as:

- Telecommunications
- Electrical systems
- Mechanical systems
- Resiliency levels
- Building architecture
- Fire safety
- Physical security
- Monitoring

TIA-942 certification programs are offered through TIA-licensed certification bodies that assess and certify compliance to the TIA-942 standard. TIA has released a licensing scheme for TIA-942 audits and has laid down specific criteria for organizations who wish to conduct 3rd party external audits. Once fulfilled they will be licensed as a CAB - Conformity Assessment Body. Data centers conforming to the TIA-942 standard are listed on the website; https://tiaonline.org/942-datacenters/.

== Newer revisions ==
The ANSI/TIA-942-C has been published in May 2024.
