= TIA-569-B =

The Telecommunications Industry Association's TIA-569-B is a Commercial Building Standard for Telecommunications Pathways and Spaces standardizes specific pathway and space design and construction practices in support of telecommunications media and equipment within buildings.

== Changes from TIA 569-A ==
Key changes from TIA-569-A are:

- Multi-tenant pathways and spaces for wireline and wireless technologies are specified.
- Common equipment rooms and common telecommunications rooms are identified and specified.
- The main terminal space has been eliminated, and has been replaced by the common equipment room.
- A new space, telecommunications enclosure, has been added.
- Requirements for building automation system spaces have been added, including horizontal connection point and zone box.
- “Bypass” pathways are discussed.
- Pull tension information has been added.
- Fill capacity is provided for furniture systems.
- Fill capacity is provided for perimeter raceways.
- Design requirements for poke-thru fittings.
- Access floor heights are adjusted.
- In-floor systems include underfloor duct and cellular raceways.
- Pathway fill is provided for cable tray.
- A discussion of telecommunications diversity has been added.
- Noise reduction guidelines have been added.

== Goals ==
A principal goal of this Standard is to be useful to the building owners and occupants who otherwise would live with the daily problems associated with buildings that are not properly designed and constructed to support telecommunications. A properly designed and constructed facility is adaptable to change over the life of the facility. Owners and occupants should assume that better telecommunications facilities are constructed through the use of this Standard. Indeed, part of the expected usefulness of this Standard is that it be referenced in documents such as bid requests, specifications, and contracts leading up to the construction of the facilities.

This Standard should also prove useful to the team that is responsible for delivering a well-designed facility to the owner – the architects, engineers, and the construction industry. A good understanding of this Standard by this team will significantly reduce unforeseen problems associated with the telecommunications infrastructure. Two organizations, in particular, are lauded for their supportive role as this Standard was initially developed – the American Institute of Architects (AIA) and the Construction Specifications Institute (CSI).

Other organizations will also benefit from an understanding of the Standard. In particular, the Building Owners and Managers Association (BOMA), BICSI, a Telecommunications Association, and the International Facility Management Association (IFMA) will find this Standard closely aligned with their goals for good building design and construction. This Standard generally makes no specific recommendations among the design alternatives available for telecommunications pathways and spaces. For example, the choice between a conduit system versus a tray system is not delineated. It is up to the telecommunications designer to properly select among the alternatives based upon the applications at hand and the constraints imposed.

== Current Revision ==
As of 2019, the current revision of TIA-569 is E.
