= TIA-607-B =

Covering the grounding and bonding requirements for a building's electrical system and telecommunications cabling infrastructure, TIA-607-B is an American National Standard created by the Telecommunications Industry Association, which facilitates the design and installation of telecom grounding/bonding systems.

Grounding and bonding not only save lives by preventing electrical hazards, they also maintain a network's overall performance by ensuring that electromagnetic “noise” doesn't interfere with data transmission. Whether the telecommunications system is based on Shielded Twisted Pair (STP) or Unshielded Twisted Pair (UTP) cable, TIA-607-B requires that each and every metallic component making contact with a telecom cabling infrastructure be bonded, even if it is merely touching another metal component that is directly attached.

According to the standard, proper infrastructure bonding requires the following elements: a telecommunications main grounding busbar (TMGB), telecommunications grounding busbars (TGB), telecommunications bonding backbone (TBB), grounding equalizers (GE), and a bonding conductor for telecommunications (BCT). Among TIA-607-B's list of metallic components in need of bonding are racks, enclosures, ladders, surge protectors, cable trays, routers, switches and patch panels.

Following the bonding of telecom infrastructure components, the entire system must be bonded to the building's main ground, which is sometimes also referred to as a grounding electrode system.
