= E-LABEL Act =

Enhance Labeling, Accessing, and Branding of Electronic Licenses Act of 2014
- Long title: To promote the non-exclusive use of electronic labeling for devices licensed by the Federal Communications Commission.
- Acronyms (colloquial): E-LABEL Act
- Announced in: the 113th United States Congress
- Sponsored by: Rep. Robert E. Latta (R, OH-5)
- Number of co-sponsors: 3

Codification
- U.S.C. sections affected: 47 U.S.C. § 601 et seq., 47 U.S.C. § 302a
- Agencies affected: United States Congress, Federal Communications Commission

Legislative history
- Introduced in the House as H.R. 5161 by Rep. Robert E. Latta (R, OH-5) on July 22, 2014; Committee consideration by United States House Committee on Energy and Commerce, United States House Energy Subcommittee on Communications and Technology; Passed the House on September 11, 2014 (Roll Call Vote 496: 402-0)

The Enhance Labeling, Accessing, and Branding of Electronic Licenses Act of 2014 or the E-LABEL Act (H.R. 5161) is a bill that would direct the Federal Communications Commission (FCC) to allow manufacturers of electronic devices with a screen to display information required by the agency digitally on the screen rather than on a label affixed to the device.

The bill was introduced into the United States House of Representatives during the 113th United States Congress.

== Provisions of the bill ==
This summary is based largely on the summary provided by the Congressional Research Service, a public domain source.

The Enhance Labeling, Accessing, and Branding of Electronic Licenses Act of 2014 or the E-LABEL Act would amend the Communications Act of 1934 to require the Federal Communications Commission (FCC) to promulgate regulations or take other appropriate action to allow manufacturers of radiofrequency devices with display the option to use electronic labeling for the equipment in place of affixing physical labels to the equipment.

The bill would define "radiofrequency device with display" as any equipment or device that: (1) requires the FCC's authorization before the equipment or device may be marketed or sold within the United States, and (2) is capable of digitally displaying required labeling and regulatory information.

== Congressional Budget Office report ==
This summary is based largely on the summary provided by the Congressional Budget Office, as ordered reported by the House Committee on Energy and Commerce on July 30, 2014. This is a public domain source.

The Congressional Budget Office (CBO) estimates that implementing H.R. 5161 would have a negligible effect on net discretionary costs over the 2015-2019 period. Enacting H.R. 5161 would not affect direct spending or revenues; therefore, pay-as-you-go procedures do not apply.

H.R. 5161 would direct the Federal Communications Commission (FCC) to allow manufacturers of electronic devices with a screen to display information required by the agency digitally on the screen rather than on a label affixed to the device. On July 10, 2014, the FCC issued guidance that describes how devices with integrated displays can present label information electronically.

Based on information from the FCC, the CBO expects that any additional actions that agency would take to comply with the bill's requirements would not have a significant effect on the agency's workload, and thus, its spending. In addition, the FCC is authorized to collect fees sufficient to cover its annual appropriation; therefore, CBO estimates that implementing H.R. 5161 would have a negligible effect on net discretionary costs, assuming appropriation action consistent with that authority.

H.R. 5161 contains no intergovernmental or private-sector mandates as defined in the Unfunded Mandates Reform Act and would not affect the budgets of state, local, or tribal governments.

== Procedural history ==
The E-LABEL Act was introduced into the United States House of Representatives on July 22, 2014, by Rep. Robert E. Latta (R, OH-5). The bill was referred to the United States House Committee on Energy and Commerce and the United States House Energy Subcommittee on Communications and Technology. It was reported by the committee on September 8, 2014, alongside House Report 113-575. On September 11, 2014, the House voted in Roll Call Vote 496 to pass the bill 402–0.

== Debate and discussion ==
Rep. Latta, who sponsored the bill, argued that e-labeling would "give greater flexibility to design consumer products" and that "by some estimates e-labeling will save manufactures over $80 million a year."

Rep. Jim Matheson (D-UT) also argued in favor of the bill, saying "it will lower production costs for device manufactures, since affixing labels can require significant design time."

The Telecommunications Industry Association (TIA) supported the bill, with Grant Seiffert arguing that "by granting device manufacturers the ability to use e-labels, the legislation eases the technical and logistical burdens on manufactures and improves consumer access to important device information."

== See also ==
- List of bills in the 113th United States Congress
