= IFSP =

Printer interface

IFSP (German: Interface sternförmig parallel, Russian: Интерфейс радиальный параллельный (ИРПР)), or radial parallel interface, was a parallel interface similar to the Centronics connector (IEEE 1284) but incompatible, as it had different signal polarities and handshake protocol. It was used in printers and computers manufactured in Comecon.

All printer input signal lines were pulled up to +5V by a 220 Ohm resistor, and pulled down to ground by a 330 Ohm resistor. This allowed usage of longer cables compared to Centronics, but overloaded most usual Centronics adapters.

Some devices allowed switching between IFSP and Centronics modes, i.e. Robotron 6319—6329 were manufactured with interchangeable interface modules, allowing usage of IFSP, IFSS and Centronics.

== Signal description ==
Centronics—IFSP connection
Centronics signal	IFSP signal	IFSP signal description
Strobe	SC	Transmitter control
Data 0	D0	Data signal
Data 1	D1	—"—
Data 2	D2	—"—
Data 3	D3	—"—
Data 4	D4	—"—
Data 5	D5	—"—
Data 6	D6	—"—
Data 7	D7	—"—
ACK	—	
Busy	AC	Receiver control
PE	A4	Paper End
Sel	A0	Receiver ready
Autofeed XT	—	
Error	A2	Error
Init	—	
SLCT IN	S0	Transmitter ready
GND	Z	Ground
