= Micro ribbon connector =

Type of electrical connector

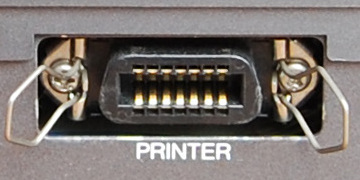
Micro ribbon 14-pin female on a Philips VG-8235 MSX2 home computer

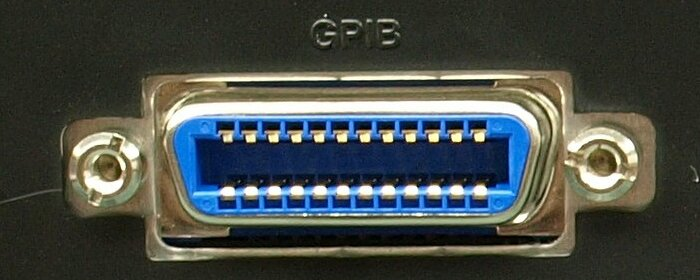
Micro ribbon 24-pin female on a LeCroy oscilloscope

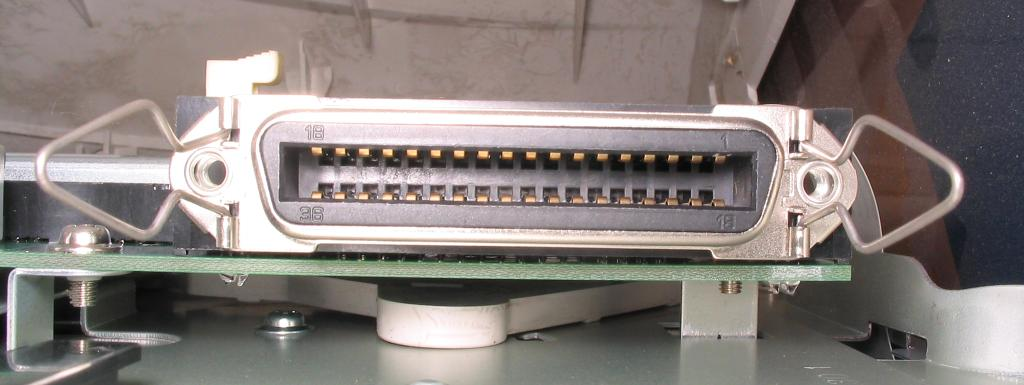
Micro ribbon 36-pin female on a circuit board

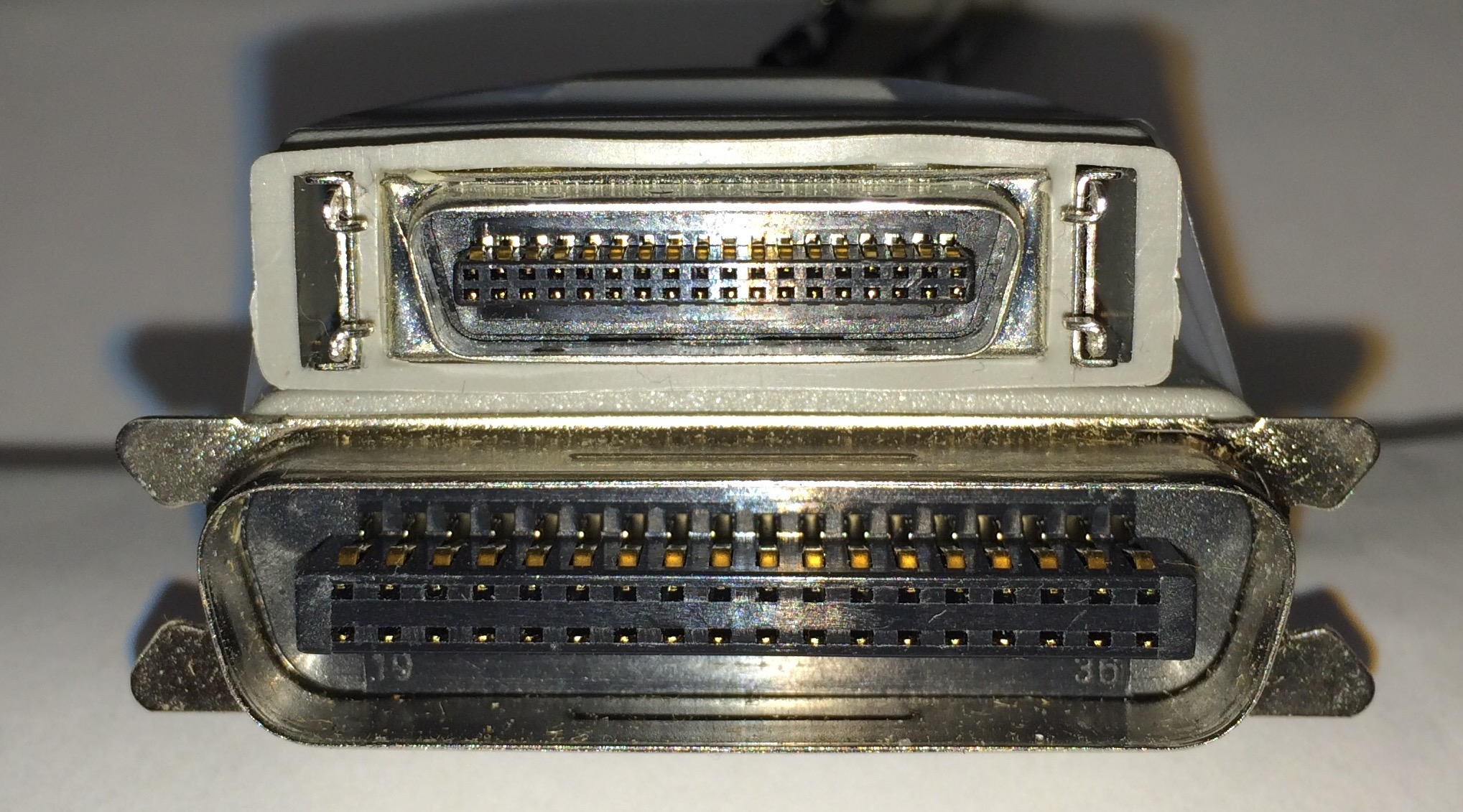
Mini-Centronics 36-pin male connector (top) with Micro ribbon 36-pin male Centronics connector (bottom)

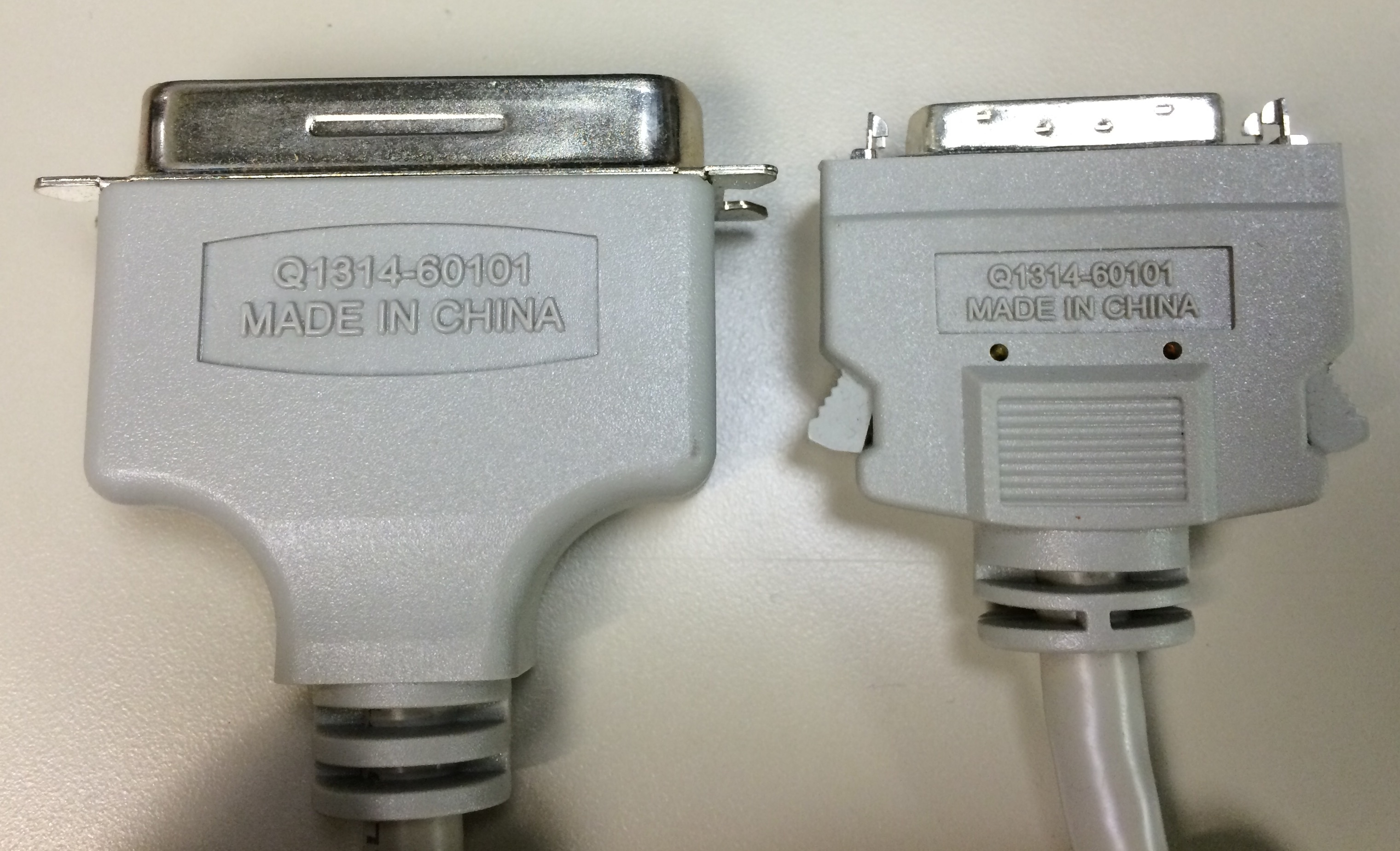
Mini-Centronics 36-pin male connector (right) with Micro ribbon 36-pin male Centronics connector (left)

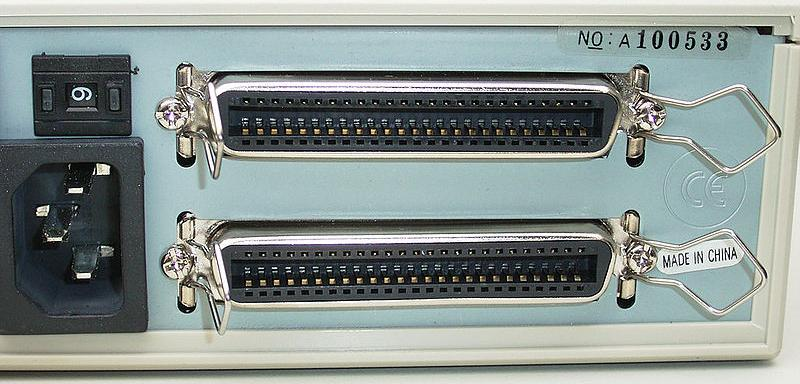
Micro ribbon 50-pin female used as SCSI-1 interfaces

The micro ribbon and miniature ribbon connectors are common types of electrical connector for a variety of applications, such as in computer and telecommunications equipment, having many contacts.

The connector contains two parallel rows of contacts within a shielded case having a characteristic D-shape similar to that used in D-subminiature connectors. The contacts are not pins, but small flat bands of metal, called ribbon contacts. The connectors are manufactured in many capacities, including 14-, 24-, 36-, 50-, 64-, and 100-pin varieties. They may be mounted on boards, panels, or may terminate cables. Wires are attached by means of solder, crimping or insulation displacement. Female connectors have bail locks for a sturdy connection to the male connector. Screws may also be employed to secure connections.

This connector type is also known as telco, 25-pair, miniature delta ribbon, mini D ribbon, delta ribbon, MDR, Amphenol, or CHAMP miniature ribbon connector. Although it was invented by Amphenol, many companies later produced it, such as 3M, TE Connectivity, and Hirose Electric Group.

Two major sizes are available. The larger size has 0.085 inch (2.16 mm) contact pitch. This size, with 36 pins and bail locks, is also known as a Centronics connector because of its introduction by Centronics for use with the parallel port of printers, and is standardized as IEEE 1284 type B. Other connectors of this size are also by some called Centronics connectors, by association to the 36-pin variety. The smaller size has 0.050 inch (1.27 mm) pitch. This size, with 36 pins, is also known as a mini-Centronics connector, and is standardized as IEEE 1284 type C.

== Applications ==
- 14-pin connector: printer port used on MSX home computers and on various other Japanese computers such as the NEC PC-6000, PC-8800 and PC-9800 series
- 20-pin connector: VESA Digital Flat Panel digital video interface
- 24-pin connector: IEEE 488 (GPIB, HP-IB) interface
- 36-pin connector: IEEE 1284 parallel interface
- 50-pin connector: SCSI-1 interface (SCSI connector)
- 50-pin connector: RJ21X "telco connector" (telephone systems)

== See also ==
- Ribbon cable
- 25-pair color code
