= IEEE 1284 =

Standard for parallel peripheral interfaces, known as the Centronics port

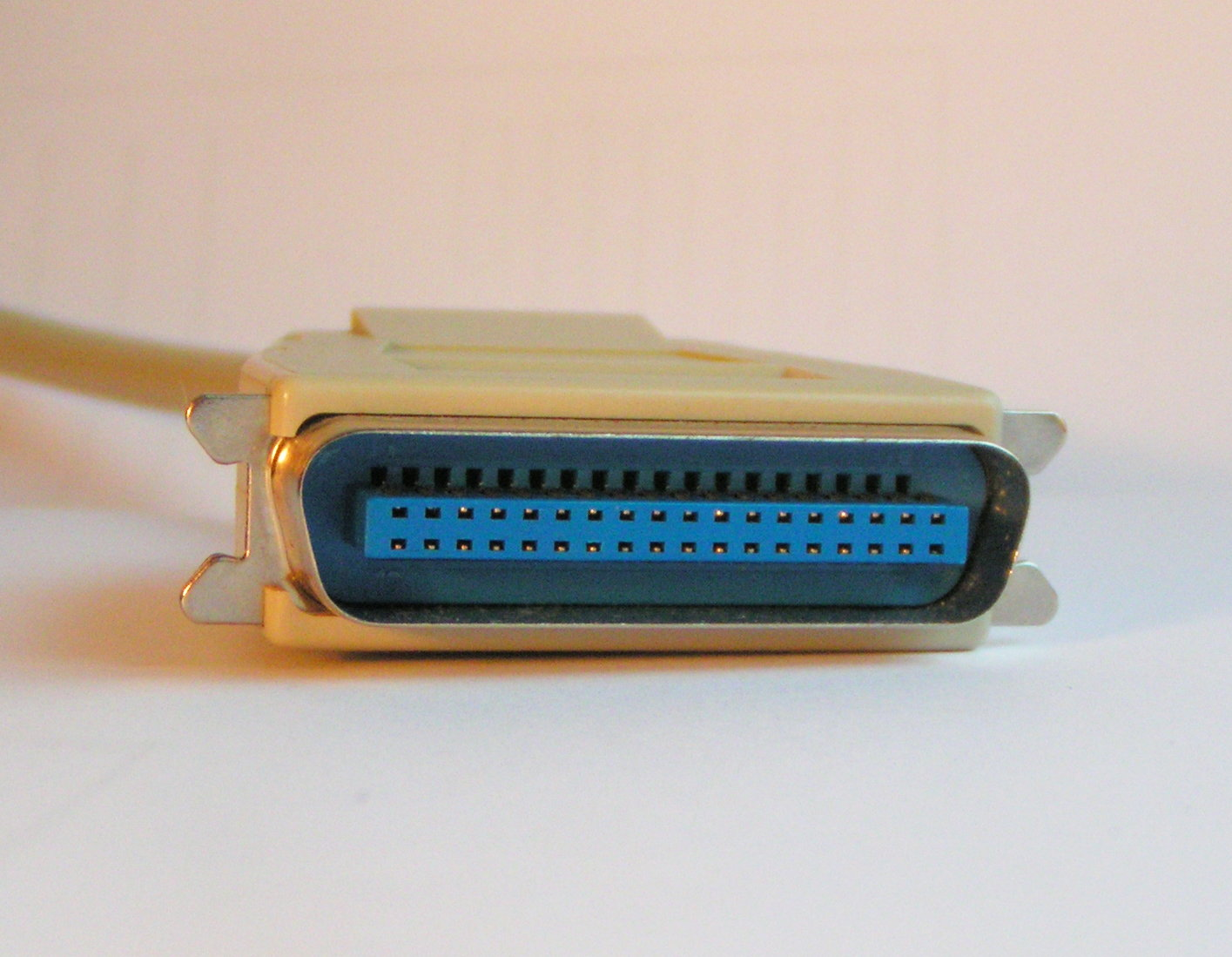
An IEEE 1284 36-pin male micro ribbon printer cable connection. The computer side of this cable normally uses a DB-25 male connector.

IEEE 1284, also known as the Centronics port, is a standard that defines bi-directional parallel communications between computers and other devices, with a theoretical maximum throughput of 4 MB/s. It was originally developed in the 1970s by Centronics for use with dot matrix printers before being formally standardized by the IEEE in March 1994.

The standard defines five operating modes Compatibility Mode, Nibble Mode, Byte Mode, Enhanced Parallel Port (EPP), and Extended Capability Port (ECP) and three connector types. It supports a variety of peripheral devices including printers, scanners, tape drives, and hard disks. Since its release, the parallel interface has been largely displaced by local area network interfaces and USB 2.0.

== History ==
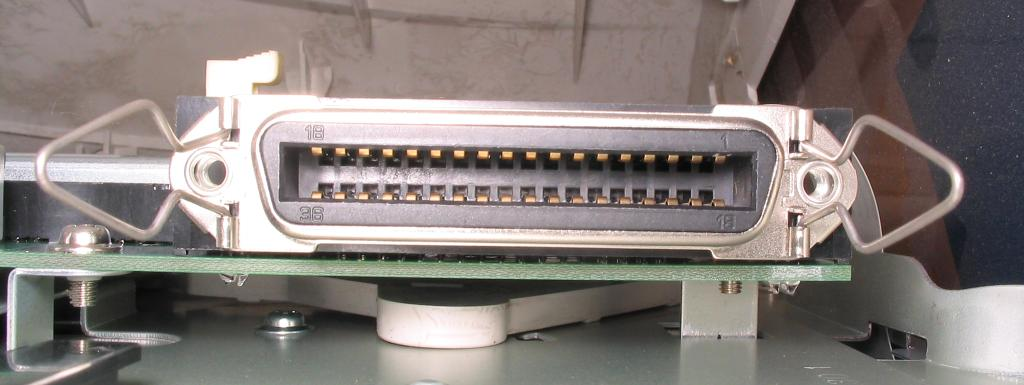
An IEEE 1284 36-pin female on a circuit board

In the 1970s, Centronics developed a parallel connector for their dot matrix printers that soon became a de facto standard.

The original port design was send-only, allowing eight bits of data to be sent from the host computer to the printer at a time. Separate pins in the port allow status information to be sent back to the computer. This was a serious limitation as printers became "smarter" and a richer set of status codes was desired. This led to an early expansion of the system introduced by HP, the "Bitronics" implementation released in 1992. This used the status pins of the original port to form a four-bit parallel port for sending arbitrary data back to the host.

A further modification, "Bi-Directional", used the status pins to indicate the direction of data flow on the eight-bit main data bus; by indicating there was data to send to the host on one of the pins, all eight data pins became available for use. This proved adaptable, and led to the "Enhanced Parallel Port" standard, which worked like Bi-Directional mode but greatly increased the signalling speeds to 2 MB/s, and later the "Extended Capability Port" version increased this to 2.5 MB/s.

In 1991 the Network Printing Alliance was formed to develop a new standard. In March 1994, the IEEE 1284 specification was released. 1284 included all of these modes, and allowed operation in any of them.

The parallel interface has since been mostly displaced by local area network interfaces and USB 2.0.

== Characteristics ==
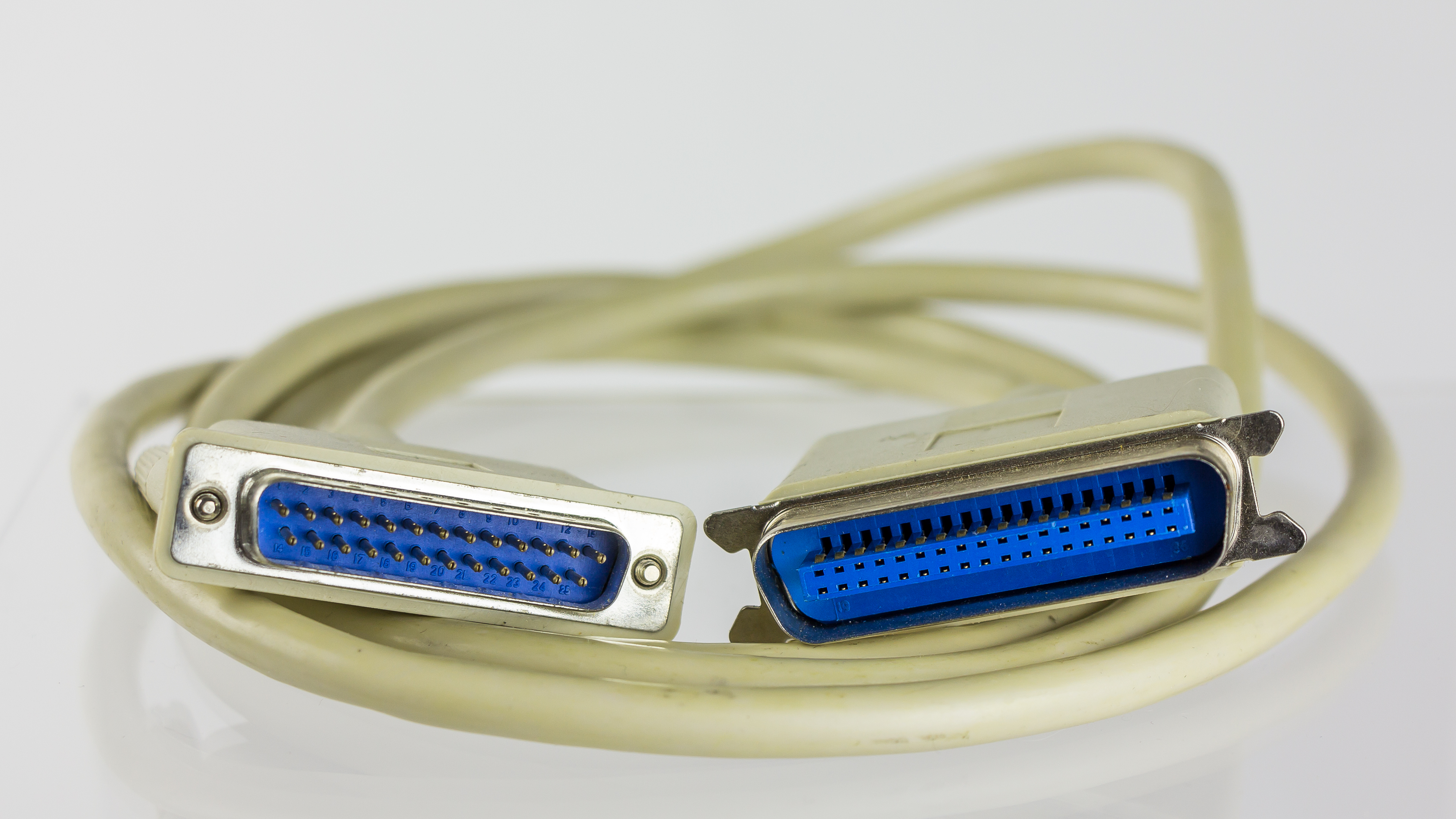
An IEEE-1284–compliant printer cable. Connectors are DB-25 for the computer and a 36-pin Centronics for the printer.

The IEEE 1284 standard allows for faster throughput and bidirectional data flow with a theoretical maximum throughput of 4 MB/s; actual throughput is around 2 MB/s depending on hardware. For printers, this allows for faster printing and back-channel status and management. Since the new standard allowed the peripheral to send large amounts of data back to the host, devices that had previously used SCSI interfaces could be produced at a much lower cost. This included scanners, tape drives, hard disks, computer networks connected directly via parallel interface, network adapters and other devices. This removed the need for a separate SCSI card, as the built-in parallel interface could be used instead.

== Modes ==
IEEE 1284 can operate in five modes:

- Compatibility Mode, also known as Centronics standard or Standard Parallel Port (SPP), is a uni-directional implementation with only a few differences from the original Centronics design. This mode is almost exclusively used for printers. The only signals that the printer can send back to the host are some fixed-meaning status lines that signal common error conditions, such as the printer running out of paper.
- Nibble Mode is an interface that allows the device to transmit data four bits (a nibble) at a time, (re)using four of the status lines of Compatibility Mode for data. This is the Bi-tronics mode introduced by HP and is generally used for enhanced printer status. Although never officially supported with these, Nibble Mode works with most of the pre-IEEE-1284 Centronics interfaces as well.
- Byte Mode, also known as "Bi-Directional" (although all modes except Compatibility Mode are in fact bi-directional), is a half-duplex mode that allows the device to transmit eight bits at a time using the same data lines that are used for the other direction. This mode is supported on a minority of pre-IEEE-1284 interfaces as well, such as those built into the IBM PS/2 computers; because of this, it is sometimes unofficially called the PS/2 mode.
- Enhanced Parallel Port (EPP) is a half-duplex bi-directional interface designed to allow devices like printers, scanners, or storage devices to transmit large amounts of data while quickly being able to switch channel direction. EPP can provide up to 2 MB/s bandwidth, approximately 15 times the speed achieved with normal parallel-port communication with far less CPU overhead.
- Extended Capability Port (ECP) is a half-duplex bi-directional interface similar to EPP, except that x86 PC implementations traditionally use ISA-style direct memory access (usually ISA DMA on channel 3) to provide even faster data transfer than EPP by having the ISA-style DMA hardware and the parallel port interface hardware handle the work of transferring the data instead of letting the CPU do this work. Many devices that interface using this mode support RLE compression. ECP can provide up to 2.5 MB/s of bandwidth, which is the natural limit of 8-bit ISA DMA. An ECP interface on a PC can improve transfers to pre-IEEE-1284 printers as well by reducing the CPU load during the transfer; however, the transfer in that case is unidirectional.

Most recent computers that include a parallel port can operate the port in ECP or EPP mode, or both simultaneously.

IEEE-1284 requires that bi-directional device communication is always initiated in Nibble Mode. If the host receives no reply in this mode, it will assume that the device is a legacy printer, and enter Compatibility Mode. Otherwise, the best mode that is supported on both sides of the connection is negotiated between the host and client devices by exchanging standardized Nibble Mode messages.

== Connectors and cables ==
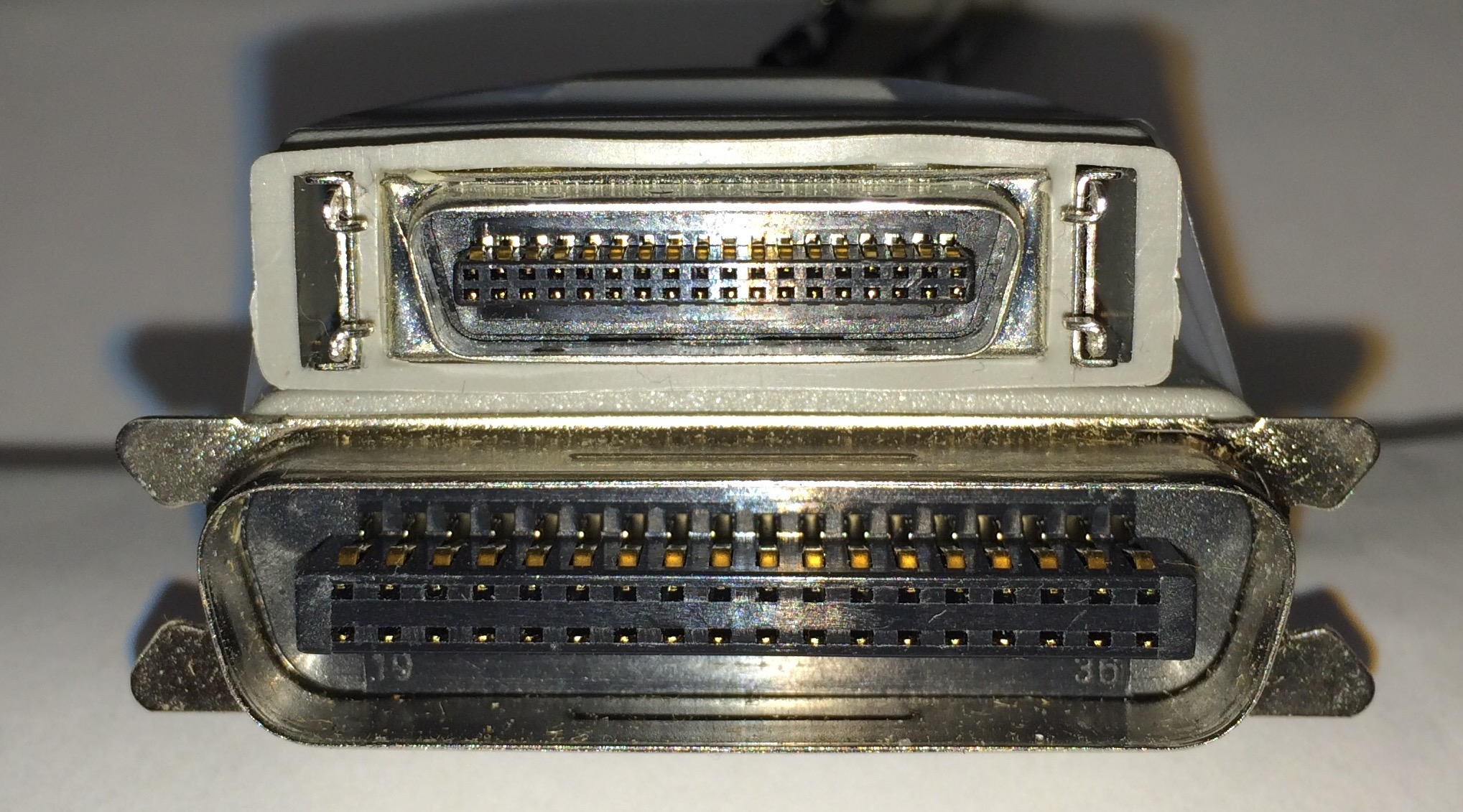
Mini-Centronics 36-pin male connector (top) with Micro ribbon 36-pin male Centronics connector (bottom)

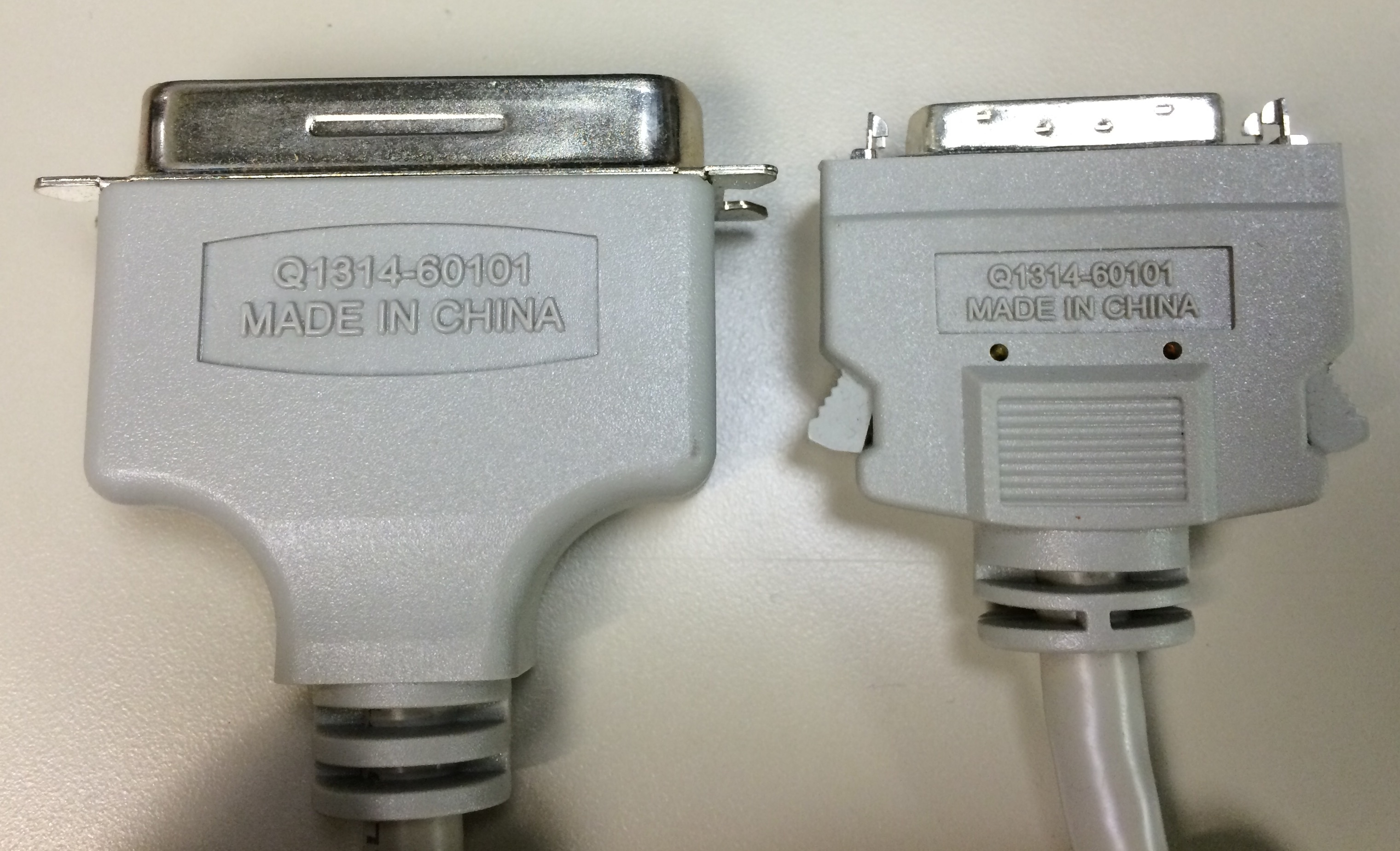
Mini-Centronics 36-pin male connector (right) with Micro ribbon 36-pin male Centronics connector (left).

An IEEE-compliant cable must meet several standards of wiring and quality. Three types of connectors are defined:

- Type A: DB-25 25 pin, for the host connection.
- Type B: Centronics (officially called "Micro Ribbon") 36-pin, for the printer or device connection.
- Type C: Mini-Centronics (MDR36 or HPCN36) 36-pin, a half-pitch, smaller alternative for the device connection that has not proven popular.

There are two kinds of IEEE 1284 cables:

- IEEE 1284-I: uses IEEE 1284-A and IEEE 1284-B connectors.
- IEEE 1284-II: uses IEEE 1284-C connectors.

In IEEE 1284 Daisy Chain Specification, up to eight devices can be connected to a single parallel port.

All modes use TTL voltage logic levels, which limits the possible cable length to a few meters unless expensive special cables are used.

== Standards ==
- IEEE 1284-2000: Standard Signaling Method for a Bi-directional Parallel Peripheral Interface for Personal Computers
- IEEE 1284.1-1997: Transport Independent Printer/System Interface- a protocol for returning printer configuration and status
- IEEE 1284.2: Standard for Test, Measurement and Conformance to IEEE 1284 (not approved)
- IEEE 1284.3-2000: Interface and Protocol Extensions to IEEE 1284-Compliant Peripherals and Host Adapters- a protocol to allow sharing of the parallel port by multiple peripherals (daisy chaining)
- IEEE 1284.4-2000: Data Delivery and Logical Channels for IEEE 1284 Interfaces- allows a device to carry on multiple, concurrent exchanges of data

== Typical color codes ==
The following are the typical colors found on 25-pin IEEE 1284 cable leads.

| Pin | Color | Alt. color |
|---|---|---|
| 1 | red | |
| 2 | pink/red | |
| 3 | brown | |
| 4 | orange | |
| 5 | light-blue/yellow | |
| 6 | light-blue/red | |
| 7 | light-blue | |
| 8 | blue | |
| 9 | light-blue/black | green/blue |
| 10 | green | |
| 11 | yellow | |
| 12 | pink/orange | |
| 13 | gray | |
| 14 | gray/green | |
| 15 | pink/blue | orange/white |
| 16 | pink/black | brown/white |
| 17 | light blue/blue | light blue/green |
| 18 | blue-white | |
| 19 | green/black | green/red |
| 20 | pink/white | yellow/black |
| 21 | gray/black | |
| 22 | white/black | gray/yellow |
| 23 | purple | |
| 24 | pink | |
| 25 | white | |
| NC | white/yellow | white/green |
| All | white/purple | red/black |

== See also ==
- IEEE 1394 – Serial bus interface standard
- IFSP – Printer interface
- List of interface bit rates
- Universal Serial Bus – Standard for computer data connections
