= P25 ISSI =

The Project 25 Inter RF Subsystem Interface (P25 ISSI) is a non-proprietary interface that enables RF subsystems (RFSSs) built by different manufacturers to be connected together into wide area networks so that users on different networks can talk with each other. The wide area network connections using the ISSI provide an extended coverage area for subscriber units (SUs) that are roaming. The extended coverage area is important for public safety first responders that provide assistance in other jurisdictions during an emergency.

The ISSI supports the messaging, and procedures necessary to enable RFSSs to track and locate SUs, set up and teardown calls and transfer voice information to the SUs. The ISSI uses SIP and RTP protocols (standardized protocols) to provide the messaging between RFSSs.

The modern Land Mobile Radio (LMR) system includes many features in addition to voice communication. Many features will not work across systems connected using the ISSI. Whether a particular feature will work is determined by the systems and the particular ISSI implementation.

== See also ==
- P25 Suite of Standards Overview
