= Life Saving Victoria =

Organisation

- “To prevent aquatic related death and injury in all Victorian communities.”

Agency overview
- Formed: 2002
- Preceding agencies: Surf Life Saving Victoria; Royal Life Saving Victoria
- Employees: 618
- Volunteers: 45265

Jurisdictional structure
- Operations jurisdiction: Victoria, Australia
- Map of Life Saving Victoria's jurisdiction

Operational structure
- Headquarters: 200 The Boulevard Port Melbourne
- Agency executives: Susan Wolff, President; Catherine Greaves, Chief Executive Officer
- Regions: Western. Otway, Surf Coast, Geelong, Port Phillip, Bayside, Kingston, Peninsula, Bass, Gippsland

Facilities
- Clubs: 57

Website
- lsv.com.au

Life Saving Victoria is an Australian life saving organisation formed in 2002 from a merger of the Victorian Branch of the Royal Life Saving Society Australia and Surf Life Saving Victoria. Life Saving Victoria works to prevent drownings and other water related deaths and injuries in Victoria. Life Saving Victoria teaches local communities in Victoria about water safety, swimming and resuscitation. It also provides surf life saving services and patrols for beaches across the state. Life Saving Victoria is an emergency support agency to Victoria Police for water based emergencies.

== Lifesaving services ==
Life Saving Victoria has a network of life saving clubs across the state. There are currently 57 life saving clubs in Victoria. Life saving clubs conduct patrols which are run by 26,000 volunteers. Patrols are conducted from November - April every summer on weekends and public holidays. During the peak-summer period, mid-week patrols may be conducted by paid lifeguards. All lifesavers have a minimum qualification of at least the lower level Surf Rescue Certificate (SRC) or the higher level Bronze Medallion which includes training on rescue techniques, resuscitation and first aid. The next level up after Bronze is the silver medallion award, consisting of three different silver awards. After the silver is the Gold Medallion award the highest level of volunteer qualification.

Life Saving Victoria also has several resources to respond to emergencies. Life Saving Victoria operates two helicopters, funded by Westpac, which patrol beaches during summer and have the capacity to rescue swimmers. Life Saving Victoria also operate IRB rescue boats, off shore rescue boats and rescue water crafts to ensure the safety of waterway users.

== Pool Safety and Watch Around Water ==
The Pool Safety Department within Life Saving Victoria assist in consulting on matters relating to pool safety including facility design, safe operation, supervision, critical incident management and general management consultancy throughout Health, Aquatics and Sporting Industry and to councils, organisations and private operators.

The Pool Safety Department provide expert recommendations in line with the Guidelines for Safer Pool Operations (GSPO) and facilitate public awareness and response to supervision of children and young people through the Watch Around Water program currently present in Aquatic facilities throughout the state. The Pool Safety Department has also launched the Victorian Public Pools Register, designed to provide an overview of services, features and safety standards at local facilities.

== Public Training and Education Services ==
Life Saving Victoria provides education and training programs to all members of the community offering public and private courses. Candidates are trained in cardiopulmonary resuscitation, first aid, pool lifeguard, teacher of swimming and water safety and additional courses accessible to members of surf lifesaving clubs. Life Saving Victoria has specialist departments who provide education programs such as Open Water Learning Experience (OWLE) programs, Swim & Survive, and specialist courses targeted towards various user groups in the community such as CALD programming, Grey Medallion programs and Professional Development to connect and strengthen industry known as Blue Connections.
