= Land mobile radio system =

Communication system

A land mobile radio system (LMRS) is a person-to-person voice communication system consisting of two-way radio transceivers (an audio transmitter and receiver in one unit) which can be stationary (base station units), mobile (installed in vehicles), or portable (handheld transceivers e.g. "walkie-talkies").

Public land mobile radio systems are available for use by commercial businesses offering communications service to the public for a fee. This would include mobile telephone and paging service, as examples.

Private land mobile radio systems are available for use by public safety organizations such as police, fire, ambulance, and other governmental entities. They are allocated frequencies exclusively for their use. Commercial Private Land Mobile systems are available for businesses in the Business, Industrial, and Land Transportation sectors. Most frequencies are shared with other users. Land mobile radio systems use channels in the VHF or UHF bands, since the antennas used at these short wavelengths are small enough to mount on vehicles or handheld transceivers. Transmitter power is usually limited to a few watts, to provide a reliable working range on the order of 3 to 20 miles (4.8 to 32 km) depending on terrain. Repeaters installed on tall buildings, hills or mountain peaks can be used to increase the coverage area. Older systems use amplitude or, usually, frequency modulation, while some recent systems use digital modulation allowing them to transmit data as well as voice. Most (30-174 MHz) systems operate simplex, with multiple radios sharing a single radio channel. Only one radio can transmit at a time. The transceiver is otherwise normally in receiving mode so the user can hear other radios on the channel. To talk, the user presses a push to talk button that turns on the transmitter of the transceiver.

== Military use ==
Land mobile radio systems are widely used by the military. Separate bands in the radio spectrum are reserved for their use. This includes portions of the 30-50 MHz band, and the entire 100-100, 100-100.8, and 540-2400 MHz bands, plus shared use of the 170- 170 MHz band.

== Commercial use ==
Many businesses and industries throughout the world use these radios as their primary means of communication, especially from a fixed location to mobile users (i.e. from a base site to a fleet of mobiles). Commercial radios are typically available in the VHF and UHF frequency bands. 30−50 MHz (sometimes called "Low VHF Band" or "Low Band"), 150.8−174 MHz (sometimes called "High VHF Band" or "High Band"), 450−470 MHz "UHF". Many larger populated areas have additional UHF frequencies from 470 to 512 MHz. There is also a tiny segment at 220 MHz for LMR, but it sees little use. The 800 MHz band (851-866 MHz) is heavily used in most of the US. Frequencies are reserved for public safety and for industrial users. The 900 MHz band (935-940 MHz) is available solely for industrial users. Finally, public safety entities are allotted an exclusive band of frequencies at 758-806 MHz. Low band has longer range capability, but requires mobile antennas as long as nine feet (2.7 m) tall. VHF bands works well in outdoor environments, over bodies of water, and many other applications. UHF bands typically perform better in urban environments and with penetrating obstacles such as buildings. Commercial and public safety users are required to obtain U.S. Federal Communications Commission licenses in the United States.

=== Repeaters ===
Mobile and portable stations have a fairly limited range, usually three to twenty miles (~5 to 32 km) depending on terrain. Repeaters can be used to increase the range of these stations. They are usually placed upon hills and buildings to increase range.

Repeaters have one or more receivers and a transmitter, with a controller. The controller activates the repeater when it detects a carrier on one of its incoming channels, representing a user talking. The repeater receives the radio signal, demodulates it to an audio signal which is filtered to remove noise, and retransmits it on a second channel to avoid interference with the first signal. This is received by a second two way radio in the repeater's expanded listening area. When the second user replies on the second channel, representing the other half of the half-duplex conversation, his signal is received by the repeater and similarly translated and retransmitted on the first channel back to the first user. Most controllers also decode Continuous Tone-Coded Squelch System tones, which allows the repeater to activate only if the station is sending a particular pre-programmed code, preventing unauthorized stations from using the repeater. Additionally, as repeaters are placed on high locations, it also prevents distant stations on the same frequency from interfering. A Morse code or a synthesized voice module may produce station ID to comply with station identification regulations. Large users assigned use of their own frequencies may be exempted from this requirement.

Repeater units utilize duplexers. These are notch filters usually in an array of six, eight, and sometimes four units. They separate the transmitter and receiver signals from each other so one antenna and coaxial line can be utilized. While this solution is very efficient and easy to install, factors such as humidity and temperature can affect the performance of duplexers, so in most configurations a dryer is installed to keep humidity out of the duplexers and coaxial cable, along with heated buildings in which they are installed in. Excellent quality coaxial cable, connectors, and antennas must also be used, as a single-antenna is not as forgiving as a dual antenna system since any RF leakage or poor connection can greatly decay the reliability and performance of the repeater. In some applications, cables going from the repeater and duplexers must be tuned to mitigate these issues.

In dual antenna systems, there are two antennas and two lengths of coaxial cable running from the transmitter and receiver. Usually, triple shield coax and or low loss Heliax are used to keep the two systems isolated. Two antenna systems are usually used if tower space is not limited, or space to build an array is available. The only issues with dual antenna systems is isolating the antennas so the receiver is not receiving what the transmitter is putting out. If this happens, it creates a loop, much like the feedback heard when a microphone is placed near a speaker. When this happens the repeater amplifies its own signal until it is either powered off or a TOT (time out timer) is expired.

To solve this antennas must be placed several wavelengths from each other in opposite vertical planes. For example, the receiver antenna is vertically polarized, while the transmitter antenna is placed one wavelength (or more) below the receiver antenna, but rotated 180° as to maintain vertical polarization. Antennas that have a null spot directly above and below them are excellent choices since another antenna can be placed in the null zone and isn't affected as much. Antennas must also be polarized the same as the stations trying to access the repeater—usually vertical polarization.

=== Interference in the spectrum ===
In November 2005, many automatic garage doors in Ottawa, Ontario, Canada, had suddenly stopped working, due to a powerful radio signal that appeared to be interfering with the remote controls that open them.

In the summer of 2004, garage door operators noticed similar phenomena around U.S. military bases. The strong radio signals on the 390 MHz band overpowered the garage door openers. One technician likened it to a whisper competing with a yell.

To address homeland defense needs and comply with government direction that agencies use the electromagnetic spectrum more efficiently, the Department of Defense (DOD) is deploying new Land Mobile Radios to military installations across the country. The new Land Mobile Radios operate in the same frequency range--380 Megahertz (MHz) to 399.9 MHz—as many unlicensed low-powered garage door openers, which have operated in this range for years. While DOD has been the authorized user of this spectrum range for several decades, their use of Land Mobile Radios between 380 MHz and 399.9 MHz is relatively new. With DOD's deployment of the new radios and increased use of the 380−399.9 MHz range of spectrum, some users of garage door openers have experienced varying levels of inoperability that has been attributed to interference caused by the new radios. Nevertheless, because garage door openers operate as unlicensed devices, they must accept any interference from authorized spectrum users. This requirement stems from Part 15 of the Federal Communications Commission (FCC) regulations. Garage door openers and other unlicensed devices are often referred to as "Part 15 devices." Congress requested that GAO review the potential spectrum interference caused by DOD's recent deployment of land mobile radios. Specifically, Congress asked us to (1) determine the extent of the problem of spectrum interference associated with the recent testing and use of mobile radios at military facilities in the United States, (2) review the efforts made by DOD during the development of its land mobile radio system to identify and avoid spectrum interference, and (3) identify efforts to address the problem.

— Government Accountability Office report GAO-06-172R

== See also ==
- Astro (Motorola)
- Land mobile service
