= Color code =

System for displaying information by using different colors

25-pair color code chart used in certain kinds of wiring

A color code is a system for encoding and representing non-color information with colors to facilitate communication. This information tends to be categorical (representing unordered/qualitative categories) though may also be sequential (representing an ordered/quantitative variable).

== History ==
The earliest examples of color codes in use are for long-distance communication by use of flags, as in semaphore communication. The United Kingdom adopted a color code scheme for such communication wherein red signified danger and white signified safety, with other colors having similar assignments of meaning.

As chemistry and other technologies advanced, it became expedient to use coloration as a signal for telling apart things that would otherwise be confusingly similar, such as wiring in electrical and electronic devices, and pharmaceutical pills.

== Encoded Variable ==
A color code encodes a variable, which may have different representations, where the color code type should match the variable type:

- Categorical variable – the variable may represent discrete values of unordered qualitative data (e.g. blood type)
  - Binary variables are typically treated as a categorical variable (e.g. sex)
- Quantitative variable – the variable represents ordered, quantitative data (e.g. age)
  - Discrete quantitative data (e.g. the 6 sides of a die: 1,2,3,4,5,6) are sometimes treated as a categorical variable, despite the ordered nature.

== Types ==
The types of color code are:

- Categorical – the colors are unordered, but are chosen to maximize saliency of the colors, by maximizing color difference between all color pair permutations.
- Continuous – the colors are ordered and form a smooth color gradient.
- Discrete – only a subset of a continuous color code are used (still ordered), where each is distinguishable from the others.

=== Categorical ===
When color is the only varied attribute, the color code is unidimensional. When other attributes are varied (e.g. shape, size), the code is multidimensional, where the dimensions can be independent (each encoding separate variables) or redundant (encoding the same variable). Partial redundancy sees one variable as a subset of another. For example, playing card suits are multidimensional with color (black, red) and shape (club, diamond, heart, spade), which are partially redundant since clubs and spades are always black and diamonds and hearts are always red. Tasks using categorical color codes can be classified as identification tasks, where a single stimulus is shown and must be identified (connotatively or denotatively), versus search tasks, where a color stimulus must be found within a field of heterogenous stimuli. Performance in these tasks is measured by speed and/or accuracy.

The ideal color scheme for a categorical color code depends on whether speed or accuracy is more important. Despite humans being able to distinguish 150 distinct colors along the hue dimension during comparative task, evidence supports that color schemes where colors differ only by hue (equal luminosity and colorfulness) should have a maximum of eight categories with optimized stimulus spacing along the hue dimension, though this would not be color blind accessible. The IALA recommends categorical color codes in seven colors: red, orange, yellow, green, blue, white and black. Adding redundant coding of luminosity and colorfulness adds information and increases speed and accuracy of color decoding tasks. Color codes are superior to others (encoding to letters, shape, size, etc.) in certain types of tasks. Adding color as a redundant attribute to a numeral or letter encoding in search tasks decreased time by 50–75%, but in unidimensional identification tasks, using alphanumeric or line inclination codes caused less errors than color codes.

Several studies demonstrate a subjective preference for color codes over achromatic codes (e.g. shapes), even in studies where color coding did not increase performance over achromatic coding. Subjects reported the tasks as less monotonous and less inducing of eye strain and fatigue.

The ability to discriminate color differences decreases rapidly as the visual angle subtends less than 12' (0.2° or ~2 mm at a viewing distance of 50 cm), so color stimulus of at least 3 mm in diameter or thickness is recommended when the color is on paper or on a screen. Under normal conditions, colored backgrounds do not affect the interpretation of color codes, but chromatic (and/or low) illumination of surface color code can degrade performance.

== Criticism ==
Color codes present some potential problems. On forms and signage, the use of color can distract from black and white text.

Color codes are often designed without consideration for accessibility to color blind and blind people, and may even be inaccessible for those with normal color vision, since use of many colors to code many variables can lead to use of confusingly similar colors. Only 15–40% of the colorblind can correctly name surface color codes with 8–10 color categories, most of which test as mildly colorblind. This finding uses ideal illumination; when dimmer illumination is used, performance drops sharply.

== Examples ==
Systems incorporating color-coding include:

- In electricity:
  - 25-pair color code – telecommunications wiring
  - ANSI Z535.1 Color Safety Code Standards
  - Audio and video interfaces and connectors § Color codes
  - Optical fibers § Color codes
  - Electrical wiring – AC power phase, neutral, and grounding wires
  - Electronic color code AKA resistor or EIA color code (today – IEC 60062:2016)
  - Ethernet twisted-pair wiring – local area networks
  - Jumper cables used to jump-start a vehicle
  - PC99 connectors and ports
  - Surround sound ports and cables
  - Three-phase electric power § Color codes (electrical wiring)
- In video games
  - Health and magic points
  - To distinguish friend from foe, for instance in StarCraft, Halo, or League of Legends
  - To distinguish rarity or quality of items in adventure and role-playing games
- In navigation:
  - Characteristic light
  - Navigation light
  - Sea mark
  - Traffic lights
- Other technology:
  - At point of sale (especially for packaging within a huge range of products: to quickly differentiate variants, brands, categories)
  - ANSI Standardized Safety Colors ANSI Z535
  - Bottled gases
  - Fire extinguishers
  - Kerbside collection
  - Pipe marking
  - Queen bee birth year code
  - Underground utility location
  - Hospital emergency codes often incorporate colors (such as the widely used "Code Blue" indicating a cardiac arrest),
- In military use:
  - Homeland Security Advisory System
  - Artillery shells and other munitions, which are color-coded according to their pyrotechnic contents
  - List of Rainbow Codes
  - NATO Military Symbols for Land Based Systems
  - Rainbow Herbicides
- In social functions:
  - Black hat hacking, white hat, grey hat
  - Blue-collar worker, white-collar worker, pink-collar worker, grey-collar, green-collar worker
  - Handkerchief code
  - ISO 22324, Guidelines for color-coded alerts in public warning
  - Cooper's Color Code of the combat mindset
  - Rank in judo
  - Ribbon colors see: Category:Ribbon symbolism
- In religion:
  - Clerical vestments, frontals and altar hangings in Christian churches

== See also ==
- Color coding in data visualization
- Secondary notation
